

153001–153100 

|-bgcolor=#fefefe
| 153001 ||  || — || May 1, 2000 || Kitt Peak || Spacewatch || NYS || align=right | 3.5 km || 
|-id=002 bgcolor=#FFC2E0
| 153002 ||  || — || May 2, 2000 || Socorro || LINEAR || APO +1kmPHA || align=right data-sort-value="0.84" | 840 m || 
|-id=003 bgcolor=#fefefe
| 153003 ||  || — || May 7, 2000 || Socorro || LINEAR || — || align=right | 1.4 km || 
|-id=004 bgcolor=#fefefe
| 153004 ||  || — || May 7, 2000 || Socorro || LINEAR || — || align=right | 1.5 km || 
|-id=005 bgcolor=#fefefe
| 153005 ||  || — || May 7, 2000 || Socorro || LINEAR || V || align=right | 1.8 km || 
|-id=006 bgcolor=#fefefe
| 153006 ||  || — || May 7, 2000 || Socorro || LINEAR || ERI || align=right | 3.5 km || 
|-id=007 bgcolor=#fefefe
| 153007 ||  || — || May 7, 2000 || Socorro || LINEAR || NYS || align=right | 1.1 km || 
|-id=008 bgcolor=#fefefe
| 153008 ||  || — || May 7, 2000 || Socorro || LINEAR || — || align=right | 3.3 km || 
|-id=009 bgcolor=#fefefe
| 153009 ||  || — || May 9, 2000 || Socorro || LINEAR || — || align=right | 2.2 km || 
|-id=010 bgcolor=#fefefe
| 153010 ||  || — || May 6, 2000 || Socorro || LINEAR || — || align=right | 1.5 km || 
|-id=011 bgcolor=#FA8072
| 153011 ||  || — || May 10, 2000 || Anderson Mesa || LONEOS || — || align=right | 1.1 km || 
|-id=012 bgcolor=#fefefe
| 153012 ||  || — || May 2, 2000 || McDonald || T. L. Farnham || — || align=right | 1.4 km || 
|-id=013 bgcolor=#fefefe
| 153013 ||  || — || May 28, 2000 || Socorro || LINEAR || V || align=right | 1.1 km || 
|-id=014 bgcolor=#fefefe
| 153014 ||  || — || May 28, 2000 || Socorro || LINEAR || MAS || align=right | 1.1 km || 
|-id=015 bgcolor=#fefefe
| 153015 ||  || — || May 28, 2000 || Socorro || LINEAR || — || align=right | 1.9 km || 
|-id=016 bgcolor=#fefefe
| 153016 ||  || — || May 28, 2000 || Socorro || LINEAR || MAS || align=right | 1.1 km || 
|-id=017 bgcolor=#fefefe
| 153017 ||  || — || May 24, 2000 || Kitt Peak || Spacewatch || MAS || align=right | 1.1 km || 
|-id=018 bgcolor=#fefefe
| 153018 ||  || — || May 27, 2000 || Socorro || LINEAR || NYS || align=right | 1.2 km || 
|-id=019 bgcolor=#fefefe
| 153019 ||  || — || May 27, 2000 || Socorro || LINEAR || FLO || align=right | 1.2 km || 
|-id=020 bgcolor=#fefefe
| 153020 ||  || — || May 30, 2000 || Kitt Peak || Spacewatch || MAS || align=right | 1.1 km || 
|-id=021 bgcolor=#fefefe
| 153021 ||  || — || May 24, 2000 || Anderson Mesa || LONEOS || — || align=right | 1.1 km || 
|-id=022 bgcolor=#fefefe
| 153022 ||  || — || June 1, 2000 || Kitt Peak || Spacewatch || — || align=right | 1.4 km || 
|-id=023 bgcolor=#fefefe
| 153023 ||  || — || June 5, 2000 || Anderson Mesa || LONEOS || PHO || align=right | 2.6 km || 
|-id=024 bgcolor=#fefefe
| 153024 ||  || — || June 1, 2000 || Haleakala || NEAT || NYS || align=right | 1.1 km || 
|-id=025 bgcolor=#E9E9E9
| 153025 ||  || — || July 5, 2000 || Anderson Mesa || LONEOS || MIS || align=right | 3.6 km || 
|-id=026 bgcolor=#E9E9E9
| 153026 ||  || — || July 4, 2000 || Anderson Mesa || LONEOS || — || align=right | 2.2 km || 
|-id=027 bgcolor=#fefefe
| 153027 || 2000 OP || — || July 23, 2000 || Reedy Creek || J. Broughton || fast || align=right | 1.5 km || 
|-id=028 bgcolor=#d6d6d6
| 153028 ||  || — || July 30, 2000 || Socorro || LINEAR || — || align=right | 7.2 km || 
|-id=029 bgcolor=#E9E9E9
| 153029 ||  || — || July 30, 2000 || Socorro || LINEAR || — || align=right | 5.6 km || 
|-id=030 bgcolor=#E9E9E9
| 153030 ||  || — || August 1, 2000 || Socorro || LINEAR || — || align=right | 4.8 km || 
|-id=031 bgcolor=#E9E9E9
| 153031 ||  || — || August 6, 2000 || Siding Spring || R. H. McNaught || — || align=right | 5.8 km || 
|-id=032 bgcolor=#fefefe
| 153032 ||  || — || August 1, 2000 || Socorro || LINEAR || NYS || align=right | 1.1 km || 
|-id=033 bgcolor=#E9E9E9
| 153033 ||  || — || August 1, 2000 || Socorro || LINEAR || — || align=right | 1.6 km || 
|-id=034 bgcolor=#E9E9E9
| 153034 ||  || — || August 1, 2000 || Socorro || LINEAR || — || align=right | 2.6 km || 
|-id=035 bgcolor=#E9E9E9
| 153035 ||  || — || August 1, 2000 || Socorro || LINEAR || — || align=right | 1.6 km || 
|-id=036 bgcolor=#fefefe
| 153036 ||  || — || August 2, 2000 || Socorro || LINEAR || MAS || align=right | 1.1 km || 
|-id=037 bgcolor=#E9E9E9
| 153037 ||  || — || August 4, 2000 || Haleakala || NEAT || — || align=right | 2.9 km || 
|-id=038 bgcolor=#E9E9E9
| 153038 || 2000 QT || — || August 23, 2000 || Olathe || L. Robinson || ADE || align=right | 4.6 km || 
|-id=039 bgcolor=#fefefe
| 153039 ||  || — || August 24, 2000 || Socorro || LINEAR || — || align=right | 1.2 km || 
|-id=040 bgcolor=#fefefe
| 153040 ||  || — || August 24, 2000 || Socorro || LINEAR || H || align=right | 1.2 km || 
|-id=041 bgcolor=#E9E9E9
| 153041 ||  || — || August 24, 2000 || Socorro || LINEAR || — || align=right | 2.2 km || 
|-id=042 bgcolor=#E9E9E9
| 153042 ||  || — || August 24, 2000 || Socorro || LINEAR || — || align=right | 2.1 km || 
|-id=043 bgcolor=#E9E9E9
| 153043 ||  || — || August 26, 2000 || Socorro || LINEAR || — || align=right | 4.6 km || 
|-id=044 bgcolor=#E9E9E9
| 153044 ||  || — || August 24, 2000 || Socorro || LINEAR || — || align=right | 1.6 km || 
|-id=045 bgcolor=#E9E9E9
| 153045 ||  || — || August 25, 2000 || Socorro || LINEAR || — || align=right | 1.6 km || 
|-id=046 bgcolor=#E9E9E9
| 153046 ||  || — || August 28, 2000 || Socorro || LINEAR || — || align=right | 5.2 km || 
|-id=047 bgcolor=#E9E9E9
| 153047 ||  || — || August 29, 2000 || Bisei SG Center || BATTeRS || — || align=right | 2.3 km || 
|-id=048 bgcolor=#E9E9E9
| 153048 ||  || — || August 24, 2000 || Socorro || LINEAR || — || align=right | 1.3 km || 
|-id=049 bgcolor=#E9E9E9
| 153049 ||  || — || August 24, 2000 || Socorro || LINEAR || — || align=right | 2.3 km || 
|-id=050 bgcolor=#E9E9E9
| 153050 ||  || — || August 26, 2000 || Socorro || LINEAR || — || align=right | 4.5 km || 
|-id=051 bgcolor=#E9E9E9
| 153051 ||  || — || August 26, 2000 || Socorro || LINEAR || — || align=right | 1.7 km || 
|-id=052 bgcolor=#E9E9E9
| 153052 ||  || — || August 28, 2000 || Socorro || LINEAR || — || align=right | 2.4 km || 
|-id=053 bgcolor=#E9E9E9
| 153053 ||  || — || August 28, 2000 || Socorro || LINEAR || — || align=right | 2.0 km || 
|-id=054 bgcolor=#fefefe
| 153054 ||  || — || August 25, 2000 || Socorro || LINEAR || H || align=right data-sort-value="0.99" | 990 m || 
|-id=055 bgcolor=#E9E9E9
| 153055 ||  || — || August 31, 2000 || Socorro || LINEAR || — || align=right | 4.9 km || 
|-id=056 bgcolor=#E9E9E9
| 153056 ||  || — || August 31, 2000 || Socorro || LINEAR || — || align=right | 3.7 km || 
|-id=057 bgcolor=#E9E9E9
| 153057 ||  || — || August 31, 2000 || Socorro || LINEAR || — || align=right | 3.6 km || 
|-id=058 bgcolor=#E9E9E9
| 153058 ||  || — || August 26, 2000 || Socorro || LINEAR || — || align=right | 5.1 km || 
|-id=059 bgcolor=#E9E9E9
| 153059 ||  || — || August 31, 2000 || Socorro || LINEAR || — || align=right | 2.6 km || 
|-id=060 bgcolor=#E9E9E9
| 153060 ||  || — || August 31, 2000 || Socorro || LINEAR || — || align=right | 1.7 km || 
|-id=061 bgcolor=#E9E9E9
| 153061 ||  || — || August 31, 2000 || Socorro || LINEAR || — || align=right | 4.9 km || 
|-id=062 bgcolor=#E9E9E9
| 153062 ||  || — || August 31, 2000 || Socorro || LINEAR || GEF || align=right | 2.0 km || 
|-id=063 bgcolor=#E9E9E9
| 153063 ||  || — || August 31, 2000 || Socorro || LINEAR || — || align=right | 2.6 km || 
|-id=064 bgcolor=#E9E9E9
| 153064 ||  || — || August 31, 2000 || Socorro || LINEAR || DOR || align=right | 4.6 km || 
|-id=065 bgcolor=#E9E9E9
| 153065 ||  || — || August 26, 2000 || Socorro || LINEAR || EUN || align=right | 2.0 km || 
|-id=066 bgcolor=#E9E9E9
| 153066 ||  || — || August 26, 2000 || Socorro || LINEAR || — || align=right | 3.8 km || 
|-id=067 bgcolor=#E9E9E9
| 153067 ||  || — || August 26, 2000 || Socorro || LINEAR || — || align=right | 3.6 km || 
|-id=068 bgcolor=#E9E9E9
| 153068 ||  || — || August 29, 2000 || Socorro || LINEAR || — || align=right | 1.4 km || 
|-id=069 bgcolor=#fefefe
| 153069 ||  || — || August 29, 2000 || Socorro || LINEAR || — || align=right | 1.5 km || 
|-id=070 bgcolor=#E9E9E9
| 153070 ||  || — || August 31, 2000 || Socorro || LINEAR || — || align=right | 4.8 km || 
|-id=071 bgcolor=#E9E9E9
| 153071 ||  || — || August 31, 2000 || Socorro || LINEAR || MIS || align=right | 3.1 km || 
|-id=072 bgcolor=#E9E9E9
| 153072 ||  || — || August 31, 2000 || Socorro || LINEAR || MIS || align=right | 3.3 km || 
|-id=073 bgcolor=#E9E9E9
| 153073 ||  || — || August 31, 2000 || Socorro || LINEAR || — || align=right | 3.4 km || 
|-id=074 bgcolor=#E9E9E9
| 153074 ||  || — || August 31, 2000 || Socorro || LINEAR || — || align=right | 3.0 km || 
|-id=075 bgcolor=#fefefe
| 153075 ||  || — || August 21, 2000 || Anderson Mesa || LONEOS || — || align=right | 2.5 km || 
|-id=076 bgcolor=#E9E9E9
| 153076 ||  || — || August 31, 2000 || Socorro || LINEAR || — || align=right | 4.4 km || 
|-id=077 bgcolor=#E9E9E9
| 153077 ||  || — || August 29, 2000 || Socorro || LINEAR || HNS || align=right | 2.2 km || 
|-id=078 bgcolor=#E9E9E9
| 153078 Giovale ||  ||  || August 26, 2000 || Cerro Tololo || R. Millis || — || align=right | 1.7 km || 
|-id=079 bgcolor=#E9E9E9
| 153079 ||  || — || September 1, 2000 || Socorro || LINEAR || EUN || align=right | 2.4 km || 
|-id=080 bgcolor=#fefefe
| 153080 ||  || — || September 1, 2000 || Socorro || LINEAR || H || align=right | 1.1 km || 
|-id=081 bgcolor=#E9E9E9
| 153081 ||  || — || September 1, 2000 || Socorro || LINEAR || — || align=right | 2.1 km || 
|-id=082 bgcolor=#E9E9E9
| 153082 ||  || — || September 1, 2000 || Socorro || LINEAR || — || align=right | 1.4 km || 
|-id=083 bgcolor=#C2FFFF
| 153083 ||  || — || September 1, 2000 || Socorro || LINEAR || L5 || align=right | 20 km || 
|-id=084 bgcolor=#E9E9E9
| 153084 ||  || — || September 1, 2000 || Socorro || LINEAR || — || align=right | 2.5 km || 
|-id=085 bgcolor=#E9E9E9
| 153085 ||  || — || September 4, 2000 || Socorro || LINEAR || — || align=right | 2.2 km || 
|-id=086 bgcolor=#d6d6d6
| 153086 ||  || — || September 3, 2000 || Socorro || LINEAR || — || align=right | 4.8 km || 
|-id=087 bgcolor=#fefefe
| 153087 ||  || — || September 3, 2000 || Socorro || LINEAR || H || align=right | 1.1 km || 
|-id=088 bgcolor=#E9E9E9
| 153088 ||  || — || September 3, 2000 || Socorro || LINEAR || RAF || align=right | 2.2 km || 
|-id=089 bgcolor=#E9E9E9
| 153089 ||  || — || September 5, 2000 || Socorro || LINEAR || — || align=right | 5.5 km || 
|-id=090 bgcolor=#E9E9E9
| 153090 ||  || — || September 3, 2000 || Socorro || LINEAR || — || align=right | 5.2 km || 
|-id=091 bgcolor=#E9E9E9
| 153091 ||  || — || September 7, 2000 || Kitt Peak || Spacewatch || — || align=right | 3.9 km || 
|-id=092 bgcolor=#E9E9E9
| 153092 ||  || — || September 3, 2000 || Socorro || LINEAR || — || align=right | 3.9 km || 
|-id=093 bgcolor=#E9E9E9
| 153093 ||  || — || September 4, 2000 || Socorro || LINEAR || — || align=right | 2.8 km || 
|-id=094 bgcolor=#E9E9E9
| 153094 ||  || — || September 3, 2000 || Socorro || LINEAR || — || align=right | 3.2 km || 
|-id=095 bgcolor=#E9E9E9
| 153095 ||  || — || September 4, 2000 || Anderson Mesa || LONEOS || MRX || align=right | 2.0 km || 
|-id=096 bgcolor=#E9E9E9
| 153096 ||  || — || September 19, 2000 || Kitt Peak || Spacewatch || — || align=right | 1.6 km || 
|-id=097 bgcolor=#E9E9E9
| 153097 ||  || — || September 20, 2000 || Socorro || LINEAR || — || align=right | 3.2 km || 
|-id=098 bgcolor=#fefefe
| 153098 ||  || — || September 20, 2000 || Socorro || LINEAR || H || align=right | 1.0 km || 
|-id=099 bgcolor=#fefefe
| 153099 ||  || — || September 22, 2000 || Socorro || LINEAR || H || align=right | 1.3 km || 
|-id=100 bgcolor=#fefefe
| 153100 ||  || — || September 24, 2000 || Socorro || LINEAR || H || align=right | 1.1 km || 
|}

153101–153200 

|-bgcolor=#E9E9E9
| 153101 ||  || — || September 23, 2000 || Socorro || LINEAR || — || align=right | 1.7 km || 
|-id=102 bgcolor=#E9E9E9
| 153102 ||  || — || September 24, 2000 || Socorro || LINEAR || — || align=right | 1.4 km || 
|-id=103 bgcolor=#E9E9E9
| 153103 ||  || — || September 24, 2000 || Socorro || LINEAR || — || align=right | 2.6 km || 
|-id=104 bgcolor=#d6d6d6
| 153104 ||  || — || September 26, 2000 || Ondřejov || P. Kušnirák || — || align=right | 3.4 km || 
|-id=105 bgcolor=#E9E9E9
| 153105 ||  || — || September 25, 2000 || Črni Vrh || Črni Vrh || — || align=right | 4.3 km || 
|-id=106 bgcolor=#fefefe
| 153106 ||  || — || September 24, 2000 || Socorro || LINEAR || H || align=right data-sort-value="0.99" | 990 m || 
|-id=107 bgcolor=#C2FFFF
| 153107 ||  || — || September 24, 2000 || Socorro || LINEAR || L5 || align=right | 13 km || 
|-id=108 bgcolor=#E9E9E9
| 153108 ||  || — || September 24, 2000 || Socorro || LINEAR || EUN || align=right | 2.0 km || 
|-id=109 bgcolor=#E9E9E9
| 153109 ||  || — || September 24, 2000 || Socorro || LINEAR || — || align=right | 2.8 km || 
|-id=110 bgcolor=#E9E9E9
| 153110 ||  || — || September 24, 2000 || Socorro || LINEAR || — || align=right | 2.8 km || 
|-id=111 bgcolor=#E9E9E9
| 153111 ||  || — || September 24, 2000 || Socorro || LINEAR || — || align=right | 1.4 km || 
|-id=112 bgcolor=#E9E9E9
| 153112 ||  || — || September 24, 2000 || Socorro || LINEAR || INO || align=right | 2.5 km || 
|-id=113 bgcolor=#E9E9E9
| 153113 ||  || — || September 24, 2000 || Socorro || LINEAR || — || align=right | 2.1 km || 
|-id=114 bgcolor=#E9E9E9
| 153114 ||  || — || September 24, 2000 || Socorro || LINEAR || — || align=right | 4.0 km || 
|-id=115 bgcolor=#E9E9E9
| 153115 ||  || — || September 24, 2000 || Socorro || LINEAR || — || align=right | 2.7 km || 
|-id=116 bgcolor=#E9E9E9
| 153116 ||  || — || September 24, 2000 || Socorro || LINEAR || DOR || align=right | 4.7 km || 
|-id=117 bgcolor=#E9E9E9
| 153117 ||  || — || September 24, 2000 || Socorro || LINEAR || — || align=right | 3.3 km || 
|-id=118 bgcolor=#E9E9E9
| 153118 ||  || — || September 24, 2000 || Socorro || LINEAR || — || align=right | 3.6 km || 
|-id=119 bgcolor=#E9E9E9
| 153119 ||  || — || September 24, 2000 || Socorro || LINEAR || EUN || align=right | 2.0 km || 
|-id=120 bgcolor=#E9E9E9
| 153120 ||  || — || September 22, 2000 || Socorro || LINEAR || — || align=right | 3.4 km || 
|-id=121 bgcolor=#E9E9E9
| 153121 ||  || — || September 23, 2000 || Socorro || LINEAR || GEF || align=right | 2.4 km || 
|-id=122 bgcolor=#C2FFFF
| 153122 ||  || — || September 23, 2000 || Socorro || LINEAR || L5 || align=right | 15 km || 
|-id=123 bgcolor=#E9E9E9
| 153123 ||  || — || September 23, 2000 || Socorro || LINEAR || — || align=right | 2.9 km || 
|-id=124 bgcolor=#d6d6d6
| 153124 ||  || — || September 24, 2000 || Socorro || LINEAR || — || align=right | 2.8 km || 
|-id=125 bgcolor=#E9E9E9
| 153125 ||  || — || September 24, 2000 || Socorro || LINEAR || — || align=right | 2.5 km || 
|-id=126 bgcolor=#E9E9E9
| 153126 ||  || — || September 24, 2000 || Socorro || LINEAR || — || align=right | 4.6 km || 
|-id=127 bgcolor=#E9E9E9
| 153127 ||  || — || September 22, 2000 || Socorro || LINEAR || MAR || align=right | 2.3 km || 
|-id=128 bgcolor=#E9E9E9
| 153128 ||  || — || September 22, 2000 || Socorro || LINEAR || — || align=right | 2.6 km || 
|-id=129 bgcolor=#E9E9E9
| 153129 ||  || — || September 23, 2000 || Socorro || LINEAR || — || align=right | 4.0 km || 
|-id=130 bgcolor=#E9E9E9
| 153130 ||  || — || September 23, 2000 || Socorro || LINEAR || — || align=right | 2.8 km || 
|-id=131 bgcolor=#E9E9E9
| 153131 ||  || — || September 24, 2000 || Socorro || LINEAR || — || align=right | 3.5 km || 
|-id=132 bgcolor=#E9E9E9
| 153132 ||  || — || September 20, 2000 || Haleakala || NEAT || — || align=right | 5.5 km || 
|-id=133 bgcolor=#d6d6d6
| 153133 ||  || — || September 27, 2000 || Socorro || LINEAR || — || align=right | 6.6 km || 
|-id=134 bgcolor=#E9E9E9
| 153134 ||  || — || September 28, 2000 || Socorro || LINEAR || ADE || align=right | 4.7 km || 
|-id=135 bgcolor=#E9E9E9
| 153135 ||  || — || September 20, 2000 || Haleakala || NEAT || — || align=right | 3.3 km || 
|-id=136 bgcolor=#E9E9E9
| 153136 ||  || — || September 21, 2000 || Kitt Peak || Spacewatch || — || align=right | 1.9 km || 
|-id=137 bgcolor=#E9E9E9
| 153137 ||  || — || September 24, 2000 || Socorro || LINEAR || — || align=right | 1.5 km || 
|-id=138 bgcolor=#E9E9E9
| 153138 ||  || — || September 24, 2000 || Socorro || LINEAR || — || align=right | 2.1 km || 
|-id=139 bgcolor=#d6d6d6
| 153139 ||  || — || September 24, 2000 || Socorro || LINEAR || — || align=right | 2.8 km || 
|-id=140 bgcolor=#E9E9E9
| 153140 ||  || — || September 24, 2000 || Socorro || LINEAR || — || align=right | 3.0 km || 
|-id=141 bgcolor=#C2FFFF
| 153141 ||  || — || September 24, 2000 || Socorro || LINEAR || L5 || align=right | 17 km || 
|-id=142 bgcolor=#E9E9E9
| 153142 ||  || — || September 24, 2000 || Socorro || LINEAR || — || align=right | 2.5 km || 
|-id=143 bgcolor=#E9E9E9
| 153143 ||  || — || September 26, 2000 || Socorro || LINEAR || — || align=right | 1.4 km || 
|-id=144 bgcolor=#E9E9E9
| 153144 ||  || — || September 28, 2000 || Socorro || LINEAR || slow || align=right | 2.5 km || 
|-id=145 bgcolor=#E9E9E9
| 153145 ||  || — || September 28, 2000 || Socorro || LINEAR || — || align=right | 2.0 km || 
|-id=146 bgcolor=#E9E9E9
| 153146 ||  || — || September 24, 2000 || Socorro || LINEAR || — || align=right | 3.6 km || 
|-id=147 bgcolor=#E9E9E9
| 153147 ||  || — || September 24, 2000 || Socorro || LINEAR || — || align=right | 3.2 km || 
|-id=148 bgcolor=#E9E9E9
| 153148 ||  || — || September 24, 2000 || Socorro || LINEAR || — || align=right | 2.3 km || 
|-id=149 bgcolor=#E9E9E9
| 153149 ||  || — || September 24, 2000 || Socorro || LINEAR || — || align=right | 2.2 km || 
|-id=150 bgcolor=#fefefe
| 153150 ||  || — || September 24, 2000 || Socorro || LINEAR || — || align=right | 1.5 km || 
|-id=151 bgcolor=#E9E9E9
| 153151 ||  || — || September 27, 2000 || Socorro || LINEAR || — || align=right | 2.2 km || 
|-id=152 bgcolor=#E9E9E9
| 153152 ||  || — || September 28, 2000 || Socorro || LINEAR || — || align=right | 3.3 km || 
|-id=153 bgcolor=#E9E9E9
| 153153 ||  || — || September 27, 2000 || Socorro || LINEAR || MAR || align=right | 1.9 km || 
|-id=154 bgcolor=#E9E9E9
| 153154 ||  || — || September 27, 2000 || Socorro || LINEAR || MRX || align=right | 1.8 km || 
|-id=155 bgcolor=#C2FFFF
| 153155 ||  || — || September 28, 2000 || Socorro || LINEAR || L5 || align=right | 15 km || 
|-id=156 bgcolor=#E9E9E9
| 153156 ||  || — || September 28, 2000 || Socorro || LINEAR || — || align=right | 3.9 km || 
|-id=157 bgcolor=#E9E9E9
| 153157 ||  || — || September 30, 2000 || Socorro || LINEAR || — || align=right | 3.8 km || 
|-id=158 bgcolor=#E9E9E9
| 153158 ||  || — || September 24, 2000 || Socorro || LINEAR || — || align=right | 3.3 km || 
|-id=159 bgcolor=#d6d6d6
| 153159 ||  || — || September 26, 2000 || Socorro || LINEAR || URS || align=right | 6.4 km || 
|-id=160 bgcolor=#d6d6d6
| 153160 ||  || — || September 27, 2000 || Socorro || LINEAR || — || align=right | 8.1 km || 
|-id=161 bgcolor=#E9E9E9
| 153161 ||  || — || September 30, 2000 || Socorro || LINEAR || — || align=right | 3.0 km || 
|-id=162 bgcolor=#E9E9E9
| 153162 ||  || — || September 29, 2000 || Kitt Peak || Spacewatch || — || align=right | 2.3 km || 
|-id=163 bgcolor=#E9E9E9
| 153163 ||  || — || September 25, 2000 || Haleakala || NEAT || PAD || align=right | 2.8 km || 
|-id=164 bgcolor=#E9E9E9
| 153164 ||  || — || October 1, 2000 || Socorro || LINEAR || — || align=right | 2.4 km || 
|-id=165 bgcolor=#E9E9E9
| 153165 ||  || — || October 1, 2000 || Socorro || LINEAR || — || align=right | 1.6 km || 
|-id=166 bgcolor=#E9E9E9
| 153166 ||  || — || October 1, 2000 || Socorro || LINEAR || — || align=right | 1.9 km || 
|-id=167 bgcolor=#E9E9E9
| 153167 ||  || — || October 3, 2000 || Socorro || LINEAR || — || align=right | 1.7 km || 
|-id=168 bgcolor=#E9E9E9
| 153168 ||  || — || October 2, 2000 || Kitt Peak || Spacewatch || — || align=right | 3.0 km || 
|-id=169 bgcolor=#d6d6d6
| 153169 ||  || — || October 6, 2000 || Anderson Mesa || LONEOS || VER || align=right | 5.2 km || 
|-id=170 bgcolor=#E9E9E9
| 153170 ||  || — || October 1, 2000 || Socorro || LINEAR || GEF || align=right | 2.1 km || 
|-id=171 bgcolor=#E9E9E9
| 153171 ||  || — || October 1, 2000 || Socorro || LINEAR || — || align=right | 1.4 km || 
|-id=172 bgcolor=#E9E9E9
| 153172 ||  || — || October 2, 2000 || Anderson Mesa || LONEOS || — || align=right | 3.4 km || 
|-id=173 bgcolor=#E9E9E9
| 153173 ||  || — || October 5, 2000 || Socorro || LINEAR || — || align=right | 5.2 km || 
|-id=174 bgcolor=#E9E9E9
| 153174 ||  || — || October 1, 2000 || Socorro || LINEAR || — || align=right | 3.1 km || 
|-id=175 bgcolor=#d6d6d6
| 153175 ||  || — || October 24, 2000 || Emerald Lane || L. Ball || EOS || align=right | 5.5 km || 
|-id=176 bgcolor=#E9E9E9
| 153176 ||  || — || October 24, 2000 || Socorro || LINEAR || — || align=right | 4.1 km || 
|-id=177 bgcolor=#E9E9E9
| 153177 ||  || — || October 24, 2000 || Socorro || LINEAR || — || align=right | 2.5 km || 
|-id=178 bgcolor=#d6d6d6
| 153178 ||  || — || October 24, 2000 || Socorro || LINEAR || — || align=right | 3.5 km || 
|-id=179 bgcolor=#E9E9E9
| 153179 ||  || — || October 24, 2000 || Socorro || LINEAR || — || align=right | 4.4 km || 
|-id=180 bgcolor=#E9E9E9
| 153180 ||  || — || October 24, 2000 || Socorro || LINEAR || — || align=right | 3.8 km || 
|-id=181 bgcolor=#E9E9E9
| 153181 ||  || — || October 24, 2000 || Socorro || LINEAR || — || align=right | 2.9 km || 
|-id=182 bgcolor=#E9E9E9
| 153182 ||  || — || October 24, 2000 || Socorro || LINEAR || — || align=right | 4.5 km || 
|-id=183 bgcolor=#E9E9E9
| 153183 ||  || — || October 25, 2000 || Socorro || LINEAR || — || align=right | 4.4 km || 
|-id=184 bgcolor=#E9E9E9
| 153184 ||  || — || October 25, 2000 || Socorro || LINEAR || — || align=right | 3.9 km || 
|-id=185 bgcolor=#E9E9E9
| 153185 ||  || — || October 26, 2000 || Socorro || LINEAR || ADE || align=right | 5.8 km || 
|-id=186 bgcolor=#E9E9E9
| 153186 ||  || — || October 24, 2000 || Socorro || LINEAR || — || align=right | 4.0 km || 
|-id=187 bgcolor=#E9E9E9
| 153187 ||  || — || October 25, 2000 || Socorro || LINEAR || — || align=right | 4.6 km || 
|-id=188 bgcolor=#E9E9E9
| 153188 ||  || — || October 31, 2000 || Socorro || LINEAR || — || align=right | 3.0 km || 
|-id=189 bgcolor=#E9E9E9
| 153189 ||  || — || October 31, 2000 || Socorro || LINEAR || RAF || align=right | 2.0 km || 
|-id=190 bgcolor=#d6d6d6
| 153190 ||  || — || October 31, 2000 || Socorro || LINEAR || — || align=right | 5.5 km || 
|-id=191 bgcolor=#E9E9E9
| 153191 ||  || — || October 25, 2000 || Socorro || LINEAR || — || align=right | 1.9 km || 
|-id=192 bgcolor=#E9E9E9
| 153192 ||  || — || November 1, 2000 || Socorro || LINEAR || — || align=right | 2.2 km || 
|-id=193 bgcolor=#E9E9E9
| 153193 ||  || — || November 1, 2000 || Socorro || LINEAR || — || align=right | 1.5 km || 
|-id=194 bgcolor=#E9E9E9
| 153194 ||  || — || November 2, 2000 || Socorro || LINEAR || — || align=right | 4.1 km || 
|-id=195 bgcolor=#FFC2E0
| 153195 ||  || — || November 16, 2000 || Socorro || LINEAR || APO +1km || align=right | 1.3 km || 
|-id=196 bgcolor=#d6d6d6
| 153196 ||  || — || November 21, 2000 || Socorro || LINEAR || — || align=right | 3.9 km || 
|-id=197 bgcolor=#d6d6d6
| 153197 ||  || — || November 25, 2000 || Kitt Peak || Spacewatch || — || align=right | 4.1 km || 
|-id=198 bgcolor=#E9E9E9
| 153198 ||  || — || November 21, 2000 || Socorro || LINEAR || WIT || align=right | 1.7 km || 
|-id=199 bgcolor=#E9E9E9
| 153199 ||  || — || November 20, 2000 || Socorro || LINEAR || — || align=right | 2.2 km || 
|-id=200 bgcolor=#E9E9E9
| 153200 ||  || — || November 20, 2000 || Socorro || LINEAR || — || align=right | 3.0 km || 
|}

153201–153300 

|-bgcolor=#FFC2E0
| 153201 ||  || — || November 29, 2000 || Socorro || LINEAR || ATEPHA || align=right data-sort-value="0.51" | 510 m || 
|-id=202 bgcolor=#E9E9E9
| 153202 ||  || — || November 20, 2000 || Socorro || LINEAR || — || align=right | 2.5 km || 
|-id=203 bgcolor=#d6d6d6
| 153203 ||  || — || November 29, 2000 || Socorro || LINEAR || THM || align=right | 3.2 km || 
|-id=204 bgcolor=#E9E9E9
| 153204 ||  || — || November 19, 2000 || Kitt Peak || Spacewatch || HOF || align=right | 4.6 km || 
|-id=205 bgcolor=#d6d6d6
| 153205 ||  || — || November 20, 2000 || Anderson Mesa || LONEOS || 628 || align=right | 2.8 km || 
|-id=206 bgcolor=#d6d6d6
| 153206 ||  || — || November 21, 2000 || Socorro || LINEAR || CHA || align=right | 3.8 km || 
|-id=207 bgcolor=#d6d6d6
| 153207 || 2000 XX || — || December 1, 2000 || Haleakala || NEAT || — || align=right | 5.0 km || 
|-id=208 bgcolor=#E9E9E9
| 153208 ||  || — || December 1, 2000 || Socorro || LINEAR || — || align=right | 3.4 km || 
|-id=209 bgcolor=#d6d6d6
| 153209 ||  || — || December 1, 2000 || Socorro || LINEAR || — || align=right | 6.2 km || 
|-id=210 bgcolor=#d6d6d6
| 153210 ||  || — || December 4, 2000 || Kitt Peak || Spacewatch || — || align=right | 4.7 km || 
|-id=211 bgcolor=#E9E9E9
| 153211 ||  || — || December 1, 2000 || Socorro || LINEAR || — || align=right | 3.4 km || 
|-id=212 bgcolor=#d6d6d6
| 153212 ||  || — || December 5, 2000 || Socorro || LINEAR || — || align=right | 4.4 km || 
|-id=213 bgcolor=#fefefe
| 153213 ||  || — || December 8, 2000 || Socorro || LINEAR || H || align=right | 1.1 km || 
|-id=214 bgcolor=#E9E9E9
| 153214 ||  || — || December 6, 2000 || Socorro || LINEAR || GEF || align=right | 2.4 km || 
|-id=215 bgcolor=#d6d6d6
| 153215 ||  || — || December 17, 2000 || Kitt Peak || Spacewatch || URS || align=right | 3.7 km || 
|-id=216 bgcolor=#d6d6d6
| 153216 ||  || — || December 28, 2000 || Fair Oaks Ranch || J. V. McClusky || — || align=right | 6.2 km || 
|-id=217 bgcolor=#d6d6d6
| 153217 ||  || — || December 26, 2000 || Haleakala || NEAT || — || align=right | 4.1 km || 
|-id=218 bgcolor=#d6d6d6
| 153218 ||  || — || December 28, 2000 || Kitt Peak || Spacewatch || HYG || align=right | 4.3 km || 
|-id=219 bgcolor=#FFC2E0
| 153219 ||  || — || December 27, 2000 || Anderson Mesa || LONEOS || AMO || align=right | 1.3 km || 
|-id=220 bgcolor=#FFC2E0
| 153220 ||  || — || December 28, 2000 || Kitt Peak || Spacewatch || APO +1kmPHA || align=right | 1.2 km || 
|-id=221 bgcolor=#d6d6d6
| 153221 ||  || — || December 30, 2000 || Socorro || LINEAR || EOS || align=right | 3.7 km || 
|-id=222 bgcolor=#d6d6d6
| 153222 ||  || — || December 30, 2000 || Socorro || LINEAR || — || align=right | 4.4 km || 
|-id=223 bgcolor=#d6d6d6
| 153223 ||  || — || December 30, 2000 || Socorro || LINEAR || — || align=right | 6.2 km || 
|-id=224 bgcolor=#d6d6d6
| 153224 ||  || — || December 30, 2000 || Socorro || LINEAR || — || align=right | 3.7 km || 
|-id=225 bgcolor=#d6d6d6
| 153225 ||  || — || December 30, 2000 || Socorro || LINEAR || — || align=right | 4.1 km || 
|-id=226 bgcolor=#d6d6d6
| 153226 ||  || — || December 30, 2000 || Socorro || LINEAR || — || align=right | 5.6 km || 
|-id=227 bgcolor=#d6d6d6
| 153227 ||  || — || December 30, 2000 || Socorro || LINEAR || — || align=right | 5.0 km || 
|-id=228 bgcolor=#d6d6d6
| 153228 ||  || — || December 30, 2000 || Socorro || LINEAR || — || align=right | 5.0 km || 
|-id=229 bgcolor=#d6d6d6
| 153229 ||  || — || December 30, 2000 || Socorro || LINEAR || — || align=right | 4.5 km || 
|-id=230 bgcolor=#d6d6d6
| 153230 ||  || — || December 30, 2000 || Socorro || LINEAR || — || align=right | 5.1 km || 
|-id=231 bgcolor=#d6d6d6
| 153231 ||  || — || December 30, 2000 || Socorro || LINEAR || EMA || align=right | 5.8 km || 
|-id=232 bgcolor=#d6d6d6
| 153232 ||  || — || December 30, 2000 || Socorro || LINEAR || — || align=right | 4.7 km || 
|-id=233 bgcolor=#d6d6d6
| 153233 ||  || — || December 30, 2000 || Socorro || LINEAR || — || align=right | 3.6 km || 
|-id=234 bgcolor=#d6d6d6
| 153234 ||  || — || December 30, 2000 || Socorro || LINEAR || — || align=right | 5.2 km || 
|-id=235 bgcolor=#d6d6d6
| 153235 ||  || — || December 31, 2000 || Anderson Mesa || LONEOS || Tj (2.96) || align=right | 4.7 km || 
|-id=236 bgcolor=#d6d6d6
| 153236 ||  || — || December 26, 2000 || Bohyunsan || Bohyunsan Obs. || — || align=right | 3.8 km || 
|-id=237 bgcolor=#d6d6d6
| 153237 ||  || — || January 3, 2001 || Desert Beaver || W. K. Y. Yeung || — || align=right | 5.8 km || 
|-id=238 bgcolor=#d6d6d6
| 153238 ||  || — || January 5, 2001 || Socorro || LINEAR || — || align=right | 3.6 km || 
|-id=239 bgcolor=#d6d6d6
| 153239 ||  || — || January 5, 2001 || Socorro || LINEAR || TIR || align=right | 5.3 km || 
|-id=240 bgcolor=#d6d6d6
| 153240 ||  || — || January 2, 2001 || Kitt Peak || Spacewatch || URS || align=right | 7.3 km || 
|-id=241 bgcolor=#d6d6d6
| 153241 ||  || — || January 15, 2001 || Socorro || LINEAR || EUP || align=right | 5.7 km || 
|-id=242 bgcolor=#fefefe
| 153242 ||  || — || January 15, 2001 || Socorro || LINEAR || H || align=right | 1.3 km || 
|-id=243 bgcolor=#FFC2E0
| 153243 ||  || — || January 15, 2001 || Socorro || LINEAR || APO +1km || align=right | 1.1 km || 
|-id=244 bgcolor=#d6d6d6
| 153244 ||  || — || January 14, 2001 || Kitt Peak || Spacewatch || MEL || align=right | 5.8 km || 
|-id=245 bgcolor=#d6d6d6
| 153245 || 2001 BK || — || January 17, 2001 || Oizumi || T. Kobayashi || HYG || align=right | 4.7 km || 
|-id=246 bgcolor=#d6d6d6
| 153246 ||  || — || January 17, 2001 || Socorro || LINEAR || — || align=right | 5.5 km || 
|-id=247 bgcolor=#d6d6d6
| 153247 ||  || — || January 16, 2001 || Bergisch Gladbach || W. Bickel || HYG || align=right | 4.8 km || 
|-id=248 bgcolor=#d6d6d6
| 153248 ||  || — || January 19, 2001 || Socorro || LINEAR || — || align=right | 6.0 km || 
|-id=249 bgcolor=#FFC2E0
| 153249 ||  || — || January 17, 2001 || Socorro || LINEAR || APO +1km || align=right | 3.2 km || 
|-id=250 bgcolor=#d6d6d6
| 153250 ||  || — || January 19, 2001 || Socorro || LINEAR || EOS || align=right | 4.0 km || 
|-id=251 bgcolor=#d6d6d6
| 153251 ||  || — || January 20, 2001 || Socorro || LINEAR || EOS || align=right | 3.0 km || 
|-id=252 bgcolor=#d6d6d6
| 153252 ||  || — || January 20, 2001 || Socorro || LINEAR || — || align=right | 5.3 km || 
|-id=253 bgcolor=#d6d6d6
| 153253 ||  || — || January 21, 2001 || Socorro || LINEAR || TIR || align=right | 4.3 km || 
|-id=254 bgcolor=#d6d6d6
| 153254 ||  || — || January 21, 2001 || Socorro || LINEAR || EOS || align=right | 3.5 km || 
|-id=255 bgcolor=#d6d6d6
| 153255 ||  || — || January 17, 2001 || Haleakala || NEAT || — || align=right | 6.6 km || 
|-id=256 bgcolor=#d6d6d6
| 153256 ||  || — || January 20, 2001 || Haleakala || NEAT || — || align=right | 6.3 km || 
|-id=257 bgcolor=#d6d6d6
| 153257 ||  || — || January 21, 2001 || Socorro || LINEAR || — || align=right | 6.4 km || 
|-id=258 bgcolor=#d6d6d6
| 153258 ||  || — || January 29, 2001 || Socorro || LINEAR || — || align=right | 5.1 km || 
|-id=259 bgcolor=#d6d6d6
| 153259 ||  || — || January 29, 2001 || Socorro || LINEAR || — || align=right | 5.1 km || 
|-id=260 bgcolor=#d6d6d6
| 153260 ||  || — || January 31, 2001 || Socorro || LINEAR || — || align=right | 7.5 km || 
|-id=261 bgcolor=#d6d6d6
| 153261 ||  || — || January 29, 2001 || Socorro || LINEAR || — || align=right | 5.7 km || 
|-id=262 bgcolor=#d6d6d6
| 153262 ||  || — || February 1, 2001 || Socorro || LINEAR || — || align=right | 6.4 km || 
|-id=263 bgcolor=#d6d6d6
| 153263 ||  || — || February 1, 2001 || Socorro || LINEAR || URS || align=right | 5.5 km || 
|-id=264 bgcolor=#d6d6d6
| 153264 ||  || — || February 1, 2001 || Socorro || LINEAR || — || align=right | 3.8 km || 
|-id=265 bgcolor=#d6d6d6
| 153265 ||  || — || February 2, 2001 || Socorro || LINEAR || — || align=right | 6.3 km || 
|-id=266 bgcolor=#d6d6d6
| 153266 ||  || — || February 11, 2001 || Eskridge || G. Hug || — || align=right | 6.5 km || 
|-id=267 bgcolor=#FFC2E0
| 153267 ||  || — || February 6, 2001 || Socorro || LINEAR || APO +1km || align=right data-sort-value="0.96" | 960 m || 
|-id=268 bgcolor=#d6d6d6
| 153268 ||  || — || February 13, 2001 || Socorro || LINEAR || EUP || align=right | 7.7 km || 
|-id=269 bgcolor=#d6d6d6
| 153269 ||  || — || February 13, 2001 || Socorro || LINEAR || — || align=right | 7.5 km || 
|-id=270 bgcolor=#d6d6d6
| 153270 ||  || — || February 13, 2001 || Socorro || LINEAR || AEG || align=right | 6.0 km || 
|-id=271 bgcolor=#FFC2E0
| 153271 ||  || — || February 15, 2001 || Socorro || LINEAR || APO +1km || align=right | 2.4 km || 
|-id=272 bgcolor=#d6d6d6
| 153272 ||  || — || February 15, 2001 || Socorro || LINEAR || THB || align=right | 6.2 km || 
|-id=273 bgcolor=#d6d6d6
| 153273 ||  || — || February 13, 2001 || Socorro || LINEAR || — || align=right | 4.6 km || 
|-id=274 bgcolor=#d6d6d6
| 153274 ||  || — || February 3, 2001 || Socorro || LINEAR || — || align=right | 7.4 km || 
|-id=275 bgcolor=#d6d6d6
| 153275 ||  || — || February 16, 2001 || Socorro || LINEAR || VER || align=right | 4.9 km || 
|-id=276 bgcolor=#d6d6d6
| 153276 ||  || — || February 17, 2001 || Socorro || LINEAR || — || align=right | 6.2 km || 
|-id=277 bgcolor=#d6d6d6
| 153277 ||  || — || February 19, 2001 || Socorro || LINEAR || HYG || align=right | 5.6 km || 
|-id=278 bgcolor=#d6d6d6
| 153278 ||  || — || February 16, 2001 || Socorro || LINEAR || — || align=right | 5.6 km || 
|-id=279 bgcolor=#d6d6d6
| 153279 ||  || — || February 16, 2001 || Socorro || LINEAR || — || align=right | 4.9 km || 
|-id=280 bgcolor=#d6d6d6
| 153280 ||  || — || February 16, 2001 || Socorro || LINEAR || EUP || align=right | 7.4 km || 
|-id=281 bgcolor=#d6d6d6
| 153281 ||  || — || February 16, 2001 || Kitt Peak || Spacewatch || — || align=right | 6.6 km || 
|-id=282 bgcolor=#d6d6d6
| 153282 ||  || — || February 19, 2001 || Socorro || LINEAR || — || align=right | 6.3 km || 
|-id=283 bgcolor=#d6d6d6
| 153283 ||  || — || February 20, 2001 || Kitt Peak || Spacewatch || HYG || align=right | 5.4 km || 
|-id=284 bgcolor=#d6d6d6
| 153284 Frieman ||  ||  || February 21, 2001 || Apache Point || SDSS || HYG || align=right | 5.0 km || 
|-id=285 bgcolor=#d6d6d6
| 153285 ||  || — || February 16, 2001 || Socorro || LINEAR || — || align=right | 5.3 km || 
|-id=286 bgcolor=#d6d6d6
| 153286 ||  || — || March 2, 2001 || Anderson Mesa || LONEOS || — || align=right | 6.0 km || 
|-id=287 bgcolor=#d6d6d6
| 153287 ||  || — || March 15, 2001 || Socorro || LINEAR || — || align=right | 6.5 km || 
|-id=288 bgcolor=#fefefe
| 153288 ||  || — || March 16, 2001 || Kitt Peak || Spacewatch || — || align=right | 1.5 km || 
|-id=289 bgcolor=#d6d6d6
| 153289 Rebeccawatson ||  ||  || March 22, 2001 || Junk Bond || D. Healy || SYL7:4 || align=right | 8.2 km || 
|-id=290 bgcolor=#d6d6d6
| 153290 ||  || — || March 19, 2001 || Anderson Mesa || LONEOS || — || align=right | 7.4 km || 
|-id=291 bgcolor=#fefefe
| 153291 ||  || — || March 19, 2001 || Anderson Mesa || LONEOS || — || align=right data-sort-value="0.86" | 860 m || 
|-id=292 bgcolor=#d6d6d6
| 153292 ||  || — || March 18, 2001 || Socorro || LINEAR || — || align=right | 7.7 km || 
|-id=293 bgcolor=#d6d6d6
| 153293 ||  || — || March 19, 2001 || Socorro || LINEAR || ALA || align=right | 7.3 km || 
|-id=294 bgcolor=#d6d6d6
| 153294 ||  || — || March 16, 2001 || Socorro || LINEAR || ALA || align=right | 6.4 km || 
|-id=295 bgcolor=#d6d6d6
| 153295 ||  || — || March 18, 2001 || Anderson Mesa || LONEOS || — || align=right | 5.1 km || 
|-id=296 bgcolor=#d6d6d6
| 153296 ||  || — || March 18, 2001 || Socorro || LINEAR || — || align=right | 5.4 km || 
|-id=297 bgcolor=#d6d6d6
| 153297 ||  || — || March 18, 2001 || Socorro || LINEAR || — || align=right | 5.3 km || 
|-id=298 bgcolor=#d6d6d6
| 153298 Paulmyers ||  ||  || March 29, 2001 || Junk Bond || D. Healy || HYG || align=right | 4.9 km || 
|-id=299 bgcolor=#d6d6d6
| 153299 ||  || — || March 26, 2001 || Haleakala || NEAT || — || align=right | 5.8 km || 
|-id=300 bgcolor=#d6d6d6
| 153300 ||  || — || March 29, 2001 || Anderson Mesa || LONEOS || THM || align=right | 4.4 km || 
|}

153301–153400 

|-bgcolor=#d6d6d6
| 153301 Alissamearle ||  ||  || March 25, 2001 || Kitt Peak || M. W. Buie || HYG || align=right | 4.4 km || 
|-id=302 bgcolor=#d6d6d6
| 153302 ||  || — || March 18, 2001 || Anderson Mesa || LONEOS || — || align=right | 6.6 km || 
|-id=303 bgcolor=#fefefe
| 153303 ||  || — || April 23, 2001 || Desert Beaver || W. K. Y. Yeung || FLO || align=right | 1.4 km || 
|-id=304 bgcolor=#fefefe
| 153304 ||  || — || April 24, 2001 || Kitt Peak || Spacewatch || FLO || align=right | 1.0 km || 
|-id=305 bgcolor=#FA8072
| 153305 ||  || — || April 26, 2001 || Anderson Mesa || LONEOS || — || align=right | 1.2 km || 
|-id=306 bgcolor=#FFC2E0
| 153306 ||  || — || May 11, 2001 || Haleakala || NEAT || AMO +1km || align=right | 1.6 km || 
|-id=307 bgcolor=#fefefe
| 153307 ||  || — || May 18, 2001 || Socorro || LINEAR || — || align=right | 1.2 km || 
|-id=308 bgcolor=#fefefe
| 153308 ||  || — || May 18, 2001 || Socorro || LINEAR || — || align=right | 2.8 km || 
|-id=309 bgcolor=#FA8072
| 153309 ||  || — || May 28, 2001 || Haleakala || NEAT || PHO || align=right | 2.5 km || 
|-id=310 bgcolor=#fefefe
| 153310 || 2001 LZ || — || June 13, 2001 || Socorro || LINEAR || — || align=right | 1.9 km || 
|-id=311 bgcolor=#FFC2E0
| 153311 ||  || — || June 18, 2001 || Palomar || NEAT || APO +1kmPHA || align=right | 1.3 km || 
|-id=312 bgcolor=#fefefe
| 153312 ||  || — || June 28, 2001 || Anderson Mesa || LONEOS || — || align=right | 1.5 km || 
|-id=313 bgcolor=#fefefe
| 153313 ||  || — || June 28, 2001 || Haleakala || NEAT || — || align=right | 1.3 km || 
|-id=314 bgcolor=#fefefe
| 153314 ||  || — || June 27, 2001 || Haleakala || NEAT || — || align=right | 1.7 km || 
|-id=315 bgcolor=#FFC2E0
| 153315 ||  || — || July 10, 2001 || Palomar || NEAT || APO || align=right data-sort-value="0.47" | 470 m || 
|-id=316 bgcolor=#fefefe
| 153316 ||  || — || July 14, 2001 || Palomar || NEAT || — || align=right | 1.6 km || 
|-id=317 bgcolor=#fefefe
| 153317 ||  || — || July 14, 2001 || Palomar || NEAT || — || align=right | 2.1 km || 
|-id=318 bgcolor=#fefefe
| 153318 ||  || — || July 17, 2001 || Anderson Mesa || LONEOS || — || align=right | 1.7 km || 
|-id=319 bgcolor=#fefefe
| 153319 ||  || — || July 17, 2001 || Haleakala || NEAT || FLO || align=right | 1.2 km || 
|-id=320 bgcolor=#fefefe
| 153320 ||  || — || July 20, 2001 || Socorro || LINEAR || — || align=right | 4.2 km || 
|-id=321 bgcolor=#fefefe
| 153321 ||  || — || July 21, 2001 || San Marcello || M. Tombelli, A. Boattini || — || align=right | 1.3 km || 
|-id=322 bgcolor=#fefefe
| 153322 ||  || — || July 21, 2001 || Anderson Mesa || LONEOS || — || align=right | 2.3 km || 
|-id=323 bgcolor=#fefefe
| 153323 ||  || — || July 18, 2001 || Haleakala || NEAT || FLO || align=right | 1.1 km || 
|-id=324 bgcolor=#fefefe
| 153324 ||  || — || July 18, 2001 || Palomar || NEAT || FLO || align=right | 1.7 km || 
|-id=325 bgcolor=#fefefe
| 153325 ||  || — || July 19, 2001 || Palomar || NEAT || V || align=right | 1.1 km || 
|-id=326 bgcolor=#fefefe
| 153326 ||  || — || July 20, 2001 || Palomar || NEAT || — || align=right | 1.3 km || 
|-id=327 bgcolor=#fefefe
| 153327 ||  || — || July 21, 2001 || Kitt Peak || Spacewatch || FLO || align=right data-sort-value="0.91" | 910 m || 
|-id=328 bgcolor=#fefefe
| 153328 ||  || — || July 20, 2001 || Palomar || NEAT || — || align=right | 1.4 km || 
|-id=329 bgcolor=#fefefe
| 153329 ||  || — || July 21, 2001 || Palomar || NEAT || — || align=right | 2.7 km || 
|-id=330 bgcolor=#fefefe
| 153330 ||  || — || July 22, 2001 || Palomar || NEAT || — || align=right | 1.5 km || 
|-id=331 bgcolor=#fefefe
| 153331 ||  || — || July 16, 2001 || Anderson Mesa || LONEOS || — || align=right | 1.4 km || 
|-id=332 bgcolor=#fefefe
| 153332 ||  || — || July 16, 2001 || Anderson Mesa || LONEOS || V || align=right | 1.3 km || 
|-id=333 bgcolor=#fefefe
| 153333 Jeanhugues ||  ||  || July 25, 2001 || Pises || Pises Obs. || NYS || align=right | 1.3 km || 
|-id=334 bgcolor=#fefefe
| 153334 ||  || — || July 21, 2001 || Palomar || NEAT || V || align=right | 1.1 km || 
|-id=335 bgcolor=#fefefe
| 153335 ||  || — || July 21, 2001 || Haleakala || NEAT || NYS || align=right data-sort-value="0.96" | 960 m || 
|-id=336 bgcolor=#fefefe
| 153336 ||  || — || July 21, 2001 || Haleakala || NEAT || EUT || align=right | 1.1 km || 
|-id=337 bgcolor=#fefefe
| 153337 ||  || — || July 19, 2001 || Haleakala || NEAT || FLO || align=right | 1.1 km || 
|-id=338 bgcolor=#fefefe
| 153338 ||  || — || July 19, 2001 || Palomar || NEAT || FLO || align=right | 1.5 km || 
|-id=339 bgcolor=#fefefe
| 153339 ||  || — || July 29, 2001 || Palomar || NEAT || NYS || align=right | 1.1 km || 
|-id=340 bgcolor=#fefefe
| 153340 ||  || — || July 22, 2001 || Socorro || LINEAR || — || align=right | 1.8 km || 
|-id=341 bgcolor=#fefefe
| 153341 ||  || — || July 23, 2001 || Haleakala || NEAT || NYS || align=right | 1.1 km || 
|-id=342 bgcolor=#fefefe
| 153342 ||  || — || July 26, 2001 || Palomar || NEAT || — || align=right | 2.5 km || 
|-id=343 bgcolor=#E9E9E9
| 153343 ||  || — || July 30, 2001 || Socorro || LINEAR || — || align=right | 2.0 km || 
|-id=344 bgcolor=#FA8072
| 153344 ||  || — || July 29, 2001 || Socorro || LINEAR || — || align=right | 1.9 km || 
|-id=345 bgcolor=#fefefe
| 153345 ||  || — || August 8, 2001 || Haleakala || NEAT || — || align=right | 1.6 km || 
|-id=346 bgcolor=#fefefe
| 153346 ||  || — || August 8, 2001 || Haleakala || NEAT || FLO || align=right | 3.1 km || 
|-id=347 bgcolor=#fefefe
| 153347 ||  || — || August 3, 2001 || Haleakala || NEAT || NYS || align=right | 1.3 km || 
|-id=348 bgcolor=#fefefe
| 153348 ||  || — || August 10, 2001 || Palomar || NEAT || — || align=right | 1.2 km || 
|-id=349 bgcolor=#FFC2E0
| 153349 ||  || — || August 10, 2001 || Palomar || NEAT || APO || align=right data-sort-value="0.72" | 720 m || 
|-id=350 bgcolor=#E9E9E9
| 153350 ||  || — || August 12, 2001 || Mallorca || S. Sánchez || MAR || align=right | 2.5 km || 
|-id=351 bgcolor=#fefefe
| 153351 ||  || — || August 10, 2001 || Haleakala || NEAT || FLO || align=right | 1.00 km || 
|-id=352 bgcolor=#fefefe
| 153352 ||  || — || August 10, 2001 || Haleakala || NEAT || NYS || align=right | 1.6 km || 
|-id=353 bgcolor=#fefefe
| 153353 ||  || — || August 10, 2001 || Haleakala || NEAT || — || align=right | 1.6 km || 
|-id=354 bgcolor=#fefefe
| 153354 ||  || — || August 10, 2001 || Haleakala || NEAT || — || align=right | 1.7 km || 
|-id=355 bgcolor=#fefefe
| 153355 ||  || — || August 11, 2001 || Haleakala || NEAT || MAS || align=right | 1.1 km || 
|-id=356 bgcolor=#fefefe
| 153356 ||  || — || August 11, 2001 || Haleakala || NEAT || V || align=right | 1.2 km || 
|-id=357 bgcolor=#d6d6d6
| 153357 ||  || — || August 11, 2001 || Haleakala || NEAT || SHU3:2 || align=right | 10 km || 
|-id=358 bgcolor=#E9E9E9
| 153358 ||  || — || August 14, 2001 || Haleakala || NEAT || — || align=right | 2.0 km || 
|-id=359 bgcolor=#fefefe
| 153359 ||  || — || August 14, 2001 || Haleakala || NEAT || — || align=right | 1.4 km || 
|-id=360 bgcolor=#fefefe
| 153360 ||  || — || August 14, 2001 || Haleakala || NEAT || V || align=right data-sort-value="0.88" | 880 m || 
|-id=361 bgcolor=#fefefe
| 153361 ||  || — || August 14, 2001 || Haleakala || NEAT || — || align=right | 1.3 km || 
|-id=362 bgcolor=#fefefe
| 153362 ||  || — || August 13, 2001 || Haleakala || NEAT || — || align=right | 1.0 km || 
|-id=363 bgcolor=#fefefe
| 153363 ||  || — || August 13, 2001 || Haleakala || NEAT || V || align=right | 1.1 km || 
|-id=364 bgcolor=#fefefe
| 153364 || 2001 QL || — || August 16, 2001 || Reedy Creek || J. Broughton || ERI || align=right | 4.8 km || 
|-id=365 bgcolor=#fefefe
| 153365 || 2001 QQ || — || August 16, 2001 || Socorro || LINEAR || — || align=right | 1.3 km || 
|-id=366 bgcolor=#fefefe
| 153366 ||  || — || August 16, 2001 || Socorro || LINEAR || — || align=right | 1.3 km || 
|-id=367 bgcolor=#E9E9E9
| 153367 ||  || — || August 16, 2001 || Socorro || LINEAR || — || align=right | 2.2 km || 
|-id=368 bgcolor=#fefefe
| 153368 ||  || — || August 16, 2001 || Socorro || LINEAR || V || align=right | 1.4 km || 
|-id=369 bgcolor=#fefefe
| 153369 ||  || — || August 16, 2001 || Socorro || LINEAR || — || align=right | 1.5 km || 
|-id=370 bgcolor=#fefefe
| 153370 ||  || — || August 16, 2001 || Socorro || LINEAR || FLO || align=right | 1.3 km || 
|-id=371 bgcolor=#fefefe
| 153371 ||  || — || August 16, 2001 || Socorro || LINEAR || — || align=right | 2.1 km || 
|-id=372 bgcolor=#E9E9E9
| 153372 ||  || — || August 16, 2001 || Socorro || LINEAR || — || align=right | 2.2 km || 
|-id=373 bgcolor=#fefefe
| 153373 ||  || — || August 16, 2001 || Socorro || LINEAR || NYS || align=right | 3.2 km || 
|-id=374 bgcolor=#fefefe
| 153374 ||  || — || August 16, 2001 || Socorro || LINEAR || — || align=right | 1.3 km || 
|-id=375 bgcolor=#fefefe
| 153375 ||  || — || August 16, 2001 || Socorro || LINEAR || FLO || align=right | 1.2 km || 
|-id=376 bgcolor=#fefefe
| 153376 ||  || — || August 16, 2001 || Socorro || LINEAR || — || align=right | 3.3 km || 
|-id=377 bgcolor=#fefefe
| 153377 ||  || — || August 16, 2001 || Socorro || LINEAR || — || align=right | 1.7 km || 
|-id=378 bgcolor=#fefefe
| 153378 ||  || — || August 16, 2001 || Socorro || LINEAR || — || align=right | 1.7 km || 
|-id=379 bgcolor=#fefefe
| 153379 ||  || — || August 16, 2001 || Socorro || LINEAR || — || align=right | 1.6 km || 
|-id=380 bgcolor=#fefefe
| 153380 ||  || — || August 16, 2001 || Socorro || LINEAR || — || align=right | 3.2 km || 
|-id=381 bgcolor=#fefefe
| 153381 ||  || — || August 16, 2001 || Socorro || LINEAR || — || align=right | 5.0 km || 
|-id=382 bgcolor=#fefefe
| 153382 ||  || — || August 16, 2001 || Socorro || LINEAR || — || align=right | 1.6 km || 
|-id=383 bgcolor=#fefefe
| 153383 ||  || — || August 16, 2001 || Socorro || LINEAR || — || align=right | 4.5 km || 
|-id=384 bgcolor=#fefefe
| 153384 ||  || — || August 16, 2001 || Socorro || LINEAR || FLO || align=right | 1.1 km || 
|-id=385 bgcolor=#fefefe
| 153385 ||  || — || August 16, 2001 || Socorro || LINEAR || V || align=right | 1.1 km || 
|-id=386 bgcolor=#d6d6d6
| 153386 ||  || — || August 16, 2001 || Socorro || LINEAR || 3:2 || align=right | 9.2 km || 
|-id=387 bgcolor=#fefefe
| 153387 ||  || — || August 16, 2001 || Socorro || LINEAR || FLO || align=right | 1.00 km || 
|-id=388 bgcolor=#fefefe
| 153388 ||  || — || August 16, 2001 || Socorro || LINEAR || — || align=right | 1.1 km || 
|-id=389 bgcolor=#fefefe
| 153389 ||  || — || August 16, 2001 || Socorro || LINEAR || NYS || align=right data-sort-value="0.86" | 860 m || 
|-id=390 bgcolor=#fefefe
| 153390 ||  || — || August 16, 2001 || Socorro || LINEAR || V || align=right | 1.2 km || 
|-id=391 bgcolor=#E9E9E9
| 153391 ||  || — || August 16, 2001 || Socorro || LINEAR || EUN || align=right | 3.1 km || 
|-id=392 bgcolor=#fefefe
| 153392 ||  || — || August 16, 2001 || Socorro || LINEAR || V || align=right | 2.1 km || 
|-id=393 bgcolor=#fefefe
| 153393 ||  || — || August 19, 2001 || Socorro || LINEAR || PHO || align=right | 2.7 km || 
|-id=394 bgcolor=#fefefe
| 153394 ||  || — || August 23, 2001 || Desert Eagle || W. K. Y. Yeung || — || align=right | 1.4 km || 
|-id=395 bgcolor=#fefefe
| 153395 ||  || — || August 19, 2001 || Socorro || LINEAR || — || align=right | 1.2 km || 
|-id=396 bgcolor=#fefefe
| 153396 ||  || — || August 22, 2001 || Socorro || LINEAR || — || align=right | 2.4 km || 
|-id=397 bgcolor=#E9E9E9
| 153397 ||  || — || August 18, 2001 || Anderson Mesa || LONEOS || — || align=right | 2.4 km || 
|-id=398 bgcolor=#fefefe
| 153398 ||  || — || August 19, 2001 || Eskridge || G. Hug || V || align=right | 1.2 km || 
|-id=399 bgcolor=#E9E9E9
| 153399 ||  || — || August 19, 2001 || Haleakala || NEAT || MAR || align=right | 1.7 km || 
|-id=400 bgcolor=#fefefe
| 153400 ||  || — || August 17, 2001 || Socorro || LINEAR || — || align=right | 1.8 km || 
|}

153401–153500 

|-bgcolor=#fefefe
| 153401 ||  || — || August 17, 2001 || Socorro || LINEAR || V || align=right | 1.2 km || 
|-id=402 bgcolor=#fefefe
| 153402 ||  || — || August 18, 2001 || Socorro || LINEAR || — || align=right | 1.9 km || 
|-id=403 bgcolor=#fefefe
| 153403 ||  || — || August 19, 2001 || Socorro || LINEAR || V || align=right | 1.2 km || 
|-id=404 bgcolor=#fefefe
| 153404 ||  || — || August 19, 2001 || Socorro || LINEAR || V || align=right | 1.0 km || 
|-id=405 bgcolor=#fefefe
| 153405 ||  || — || August 19, 2001 || Socorro || LINEAR || CLA || align=right | 3.4 km || 
|-id=406 bgcolor=#E9E9E9
| 153406 ||  || — || August 19, 2001 || Socorro || LINEAR || — || align=right | 1.2 km || 
|-id=407 bgcolor=#fefefe
| 153407 ||  || — || August 20, 2001 || Socorro || LINEAR || — || align=right | 1.8 km || 
|-id=408 bgcolor=#fefefe
| 153408 ||  || — || August 22, 2001 || Socorro || LINEAR || — || align=right | 2.1 km || 
|-id=409 bgcolor=#fefefe
| 153409 ||  || — || August 22, 2001 || Socorro || LINEAR || PHO || align=right | 2.5 km || 
|-id=410 bgcolor=#fefefe
| 153410 ||  || — || August 24, 2001 || Socorro || LINEAR || NYS || align=right | 1.4 km || 
|-id=411 bgcolor=#fefefe
| 153411 ||  || — || August 24, 2001 || Goodricke-Pigott || R. A. Tucker || — || align=right | 4.6 km || 
|-id=412 bgcolor=#fefefe
| 153412 ||  || — || August 25, 2001 || Kitt Peak || Spacewatch || MAS || align=right | 1.1 km || 
|-id=413 bgcolor=#E9E9E9
| 153413 ||  || — || August 20, 2001 || Palomar || NEAT || — || align=right | 3.1 km || 
|-id=414 bgcolor=#fefefe
| 153414 ||  || — || August 23, 2001 || Socorro || LINEAR || — || align=right | 2.3 km || 
|-id=415 bgcolor=#FFC2E0
| 153415 ||  || — || August 27, 2001 || Socorro || LINEAR || ATE +1km || align=right | 1.4 km || 
|-id=416 bgcolor=#fefefe
| 153416 ||  || — || August 23, 2001 || Anderson Mesa || LONEOS || — || align=right | 1.7 km || 
|-id=417 bgcolor=#fefefe
| 153417 ||  || — || August 23, 2001 || Anderson Mesa || LONEOS || — || align=right | 1.1 km || 
|-id=418 bgcolor=#fefefe
| 153418 ||  || — || August 26, 2001 || Socorro || LINEAR || V || align=right | 1.2 km || 
|-id=419 bgcolor=#fefefe
| 153419 ||  || — || August 23, 2001 || Kitt Peak || Spacewatch || MAS || align=right | 1.3 km || 
|-id=420 bgcolor=#fefefe
| 153420 ||  || — || August 25, 2001 || Palomar || NEAT || — || align=right | 1.9 km || 
|-id=421 bgcolor=#fefefe
| 153421 ||  || — || August 27, 2001 || Palomar || NEAT || — || align=right | 1.8 km || 
|-id=422 bgcolor=#fefefe
| 153422 ||  || — || August 25, 2001 || Palomar || NEAT || V || align=right | 1.1 km || 
|-id=423 bgcolor=#fefefe
| 153423 ||  || — || August 23, 2001 || Anderson Mesa || LONEOS || NYS || align=right | 1.6 km || 
|-id=424 bgcolor=#fefefe
| 153424 ||  || — || August 23, 2001 || Anderson Mesa || LONEOS || V || align=right data-sort-value="0.93" | 930 m || 
|-id=425 bgcolor=#fefefe
| 153425 ||  || — || August 23, 2001 || Anderson Mesa || LONEOS || — || align=right | 1.4 km || 
|-id=426 bgcolor=#fefefe
| 153426 ||  || — || August 23, 2001 || Anderson Mesa || LONEOS || — || align=right | 1.3 km || 
|-id=427 bgcolor=#fefefe
| 153427 ||  || — || August 23, 2001 || Anderson Mesa || LONEOS || CLA || align=right | 2.5 km || 
|-id=428 bgcolor=#E9E9E9
| 153428 ||  || — || August 23, 2001 || Anderson Mesa || LONEOS || — || align=right | 2.5 km || 
|-id=429 bgcolor=#fefefe
| 153429 ||  || — || August 23, 2001 || Anderson Mesa || LONEOS || NYS || align=right | 1.1 km || 
|-id=430 bgcolor=#fefefe
| 153430 ||  || — || August 23, 2001 || Anderson Mesa || LONEOS || — || align=right | 1.2 km || 
|-id=431 bgcolor=#E9E9E9
| 153431 ||  || — || August 23, 2001 || Anderson Mesa || LONEOS || — || align=right | 1.5 km || 
|-id=432 bgcolor=#fefefe
| 153432 ||  || — || August 23, 2001 || Anderson Mesa || LONEOS || — || align=right | 1.3 km || 
|-id=433 bgcolor=#E9E9E9
| 153433 ||  || — || August 23, 2001 || Anderson Mesa || LONEOS || — || align=right | 1.4 km || 
|-id=434 bgcolor=#fefefe
| 153434 ||  || — || August 24, 2001 || Anderson Mesa || LONEOS || — || align=right | 1.6 km || 
|-id=435 bgcolor=#fefefe
| 153435 ||  || — || August 24, 2001 || Socorro || LINEAR || — || align=right | 1.3 km || 
|-id=436 bgcolor=#E9E9E9
| 153436 ||  || — || August 24, 2001 || Anderson Mesa || LONEOS || — || align=right | 3.5 km || 
|-id=437 bgcolor=#E9E9E9
| 153437 ||  || — || August 24, 2001 || Desert Eagle || W. K. Y. Yeung || — || align=right | 1.2 km || 
|-id=438 bgcolor=#fefefe
| 153438 ||  || — || August 24, 2001 || Anderson Mesa || LONEOS || V || align=right | 1.1 km || 
|-id=439 bgcolor=#fefefe
| 153439 ||  || — || August 24, 2001 || Socorro || LINEAR || NYS || align=right | 1.2 km || 
|-id=440 bgcolor=#fefefe
| 153440 ||  || — || August 24, 2001 || Socorro || LINEAR || V || align=right | 1.6 km || 
|-id=441 bgcolor=#fefefe
| 153441 ||  || — || August 24, 2001 || Socorro || LINEAR || KLI || align=right | 3.3 km || 
|-id=442 bgcolor=#fefefe
| 153442 ||  || — || August 25, 2001 || Socorro || LINEAR || — || align=right | 1.3 km || 
|-id=443 bgcolor=#fefefe
| 153443 ||  || — || August 25, 2001 || Socorro || LINEAR || V || align=right | 1.1 km || 
|-id=444 bgcolor=#fefefe
| 153444 ||  || — || August 25, 2001 || Socorro || LINEAR || — || align=right | 1.3 km || 
|-id=445 bgcolor=#E9E9E9
| 153445 ||  || — || August 25, 2001 || Palomar || NEAT || — || align=right | 2.7 km || 
|-id=446 bgcolor=#fefefe
| 153446 ||  || — || August 20, 2001 || Socorro || LINEAR || — || align=right data-sort-value="0.89" | 890 m || 
|-id=447 bgcolor=#fefefe
| 153447 ||  || — || August 19, 2001 || Socorro || LINEAR || FLO || align=right | 1.9 km || 
|-id=448 bgcolor=#fefefe
| 153448 ||  || — || August 19, 2001 || Socorro || LINEAR || V || align=right | 1.2 km || 
|-id=449 bgcolor=#fefefe
| 153449 ||  || — || August 19, 2001 || Socorro || LINEAR || — || align=right | 1.4 km || 
|-id=450 bgcolor=#fefefe
| 153450 ||  || — || August 19, 2001 || Socorro || LINEAR || V || align=right | 1.2 km || 
|-id=451 bgcolor=#E9E9E9
| 153451 ||  || — || August 18, 2001 || Anderson Mesa || LONEOS || — || align=right | 2.3 km || 
|-id=452 bgcolor=#FA8072
| 153452 ||  || — || August 17, 2001 || Palomar || NEAT || — || align=right | 1.8 km || 
|-id=453 bgcolor=#fefefe
| 153453 ||  || — || August 17, 2001 || Socorro || LINEAR || — || align=right | 1.2 km || 
|-id=454 bgcolor=#fefefe
| 153454 ||  || — || August 16, 2001 || Socorro || LINEAR || V || align=right | 1.5 km || 
|-id=455 bgcolor=#fefefe
| 153455 ||  || — || August 24, 2001 || Socorro || LINEAR || MAS || align=right | 1.8 km || 
|-id=456 bgcolor=#E9E9E9
| 153456 ||  || — || August 19, 2001 || Cerro Tololo || M. W. Buie || — || align=right | 1.1 km || 
|-id=457 bgcolor=#fefefe
| 153457 ||  || — || August 19, 2001 || Cerro Tololo || M. W. Buie || — || align=right | 1.2 km || 
|-id=458 bgcolor=#fefefe
| 153458 ||  || — || August 24, 2001 || Haleakala || NEAT || NYS || align=right | 1.1 km || 
|-id=459 bgcolor=#E9E9E9
| 153459 ||  || — || August 16, 2001 || Socorro || LINEAR || — || align=right | 1.4 km || 
|-id=460 bgcolor=#FFC2E0
| 153460 || 2001 RN || — || September 7, 2001 || Socorro || LINEAR || APO || align=right data-sort-value="0.43" | 430 m || 
|-id=461 bgcolor=#E9E9E9
| 153461 ||  || — || September 7, 2001 || Socorro || LINEAR || — || align=right | 1.3 km || 
|-id=462 bgcolor=#fefefe
| 153462 ||  || — || September 8, 2001 || Socorro || LINEAR || PHO || align=right | 3.9 km || 
|-id=463 bgcolor=#fefefe
| 153463 ||  || — || September 8, 2001 || Socorro || LINEAR || — || align=right | 3.2 km || 
|-id=464 bgcolor=#C2FFFF
| 153464 ||  || — || September 10, 2001 || Desert Eagle || W. K. Y. Yeung || L5 || align=right | 18 km || 
|-id=465 bgcolor=#fefefe
| 153465 ||  || — || September 10, 2001 || Desert Eagle || W. K. Y. Yeung || V || align=right | 1.5 km || 
|-id=466 bgcolor=#fefefe
| 153466 ||  || — || September 10, 2001 || Desert Eagle || W. K. Y. Yeung || MAS || align=right | 1.4 km || 
|-id=467 bgcolor=#fefefe
| 153467 ||  || — || September 10, 2001 || Socorro || LINEAR || — || align=right | 1.8 km || 
|-id=468 bgcolor=#fefefe
| 153468 ||  || — || September 12, 2001 || San Marcello || A. Boattini, G. Forti || NYS || align=right | 1.2 km || 
|-id=469 bgcolor=#fefefe
| 153469 ||  || — || September 7, 2001 || Socorro || LINEAR || — || align=right | 1.2 km || 
|-id=470 bgcolor=#fefefe
| 153470 ||  || — || September 7, 2001 || Socorro || LINEAR || — || align=right | 1.1 km || 
|-id=471 bgcolor=#fefefe
| 153471 ||  || — || September 7, 2001 || Socorro || LINEAR || — || align=right data-sort-value="0.99" | 990 m || 
|-id=472 bgcolor=#fefefe
| 153472 ||  || — || September 8, 2001 || Socorro || LINEAR || FLO || align=right | 1.7 km || 
|-id=473 bgcolor=#fefefe
| 153473 ||  || — || September 9, 2001 || Socorro || LINEAR || — || align=right | 1.3 km || 
|-id=474 bgcolor=#FA8072
| 153474 ||  || — || September 12, 2001 || Socorro || LINEAR || — || align=right | 2.6 km || 
|-id=475 bgcolor=#fefefe
| 153475 ||  || — || September 14, 2001 || Palomar || NEAT || — || align=right | 1.3 km || 
|-id=476 bgcolor=#fefefe
| 153476 ||  || — || September 12, 2001 || Socorro || LINEAR || — || align=right | 1.3 km || 
|-id=477 bgcolor=#fefefe
| 153477 ||  || — || September 10, 2001 || Socorro || LINEAR || — || align=right | 1.8 km || 
|-id=478 bgcolor=#fefefe
| 153478 ||  || — || September 10, 2001 || Socorro || LINEAR || V || align=right | 1.3 km || 
|-id=479 bgcolor=#fefefe
| 153479 ||  || — || September 10, 2001 || Socorro || LINEAR || V || align=right | 1.4 km || 
|-id=480 bgcolor=#fefefe
| 153480 ||  || — || September 10, 2001 || Socorro || LINEAR || — || align=right | 2.0 km || 
|-id=481 bgcolor=#E9E9E9
| 153481 ||  || — || September 10, 2001 || Socorro || LINEAR || — || align=right | 1.6 km || 
|-id=482 bgcolor=#E9E9E9
| 153482 ||  || — || September 10, 2001 || Socorro || LINEAR || — || align=right | 1.6 km || 
|-id=483 bgcolor=#fefefe
| 153483 ||  || — || September 10, 2001 || Socorro || LINEAR || — || align=right | 2.2 km || 
|-id=484 bgcolor=#E9E9E9
| 153484 ||  || — || September 14, 2001 || Palomar || NEAT || HOF || align=right | 4.4 km || 
|-id=485 bgcolor=#E9E9E9
| 153485 ||  || — || September 14, 2001 || Ondřejov || P. Kušnirák || — || align=right | 2.0 km || 
|-id=486 bgcolor=#d6d6d6
| 153486 ||  || — || September 12, 2001 || Goodricke-Pigott || R. A. Tucker || — || align=right | 3.8 km || 
|-id=487 bgcolor=#fefefe
| 153487 ||  || — || September 11, 2001 || Anderson Mesa || LONEOS || — || align=right | 1.4 km || 
|-id=488 bgcolor=#E9E9E9
| 153488 ||  || — || September 11, 2001 || Anderson Mesa || LONEOS || — || align=right | 1.6 km || 
|-id=489 bgcolor=#fefefe
| 153489 ||  || — || September 11, 2001 || Anderson Mesa || LONEOS || — || align=right | 1.5 km || 
|-id=490 bgcolor=#fefefe
| 153490 ||  || — || September 11, 2001 || Anderson Mesa || LONEOS || V || align=right | 1.7 km || 
|-id=491 bgcolor=#fefefe
| 153491 ||  || — || September 11, 2001 || Anderson Mesa || LONEOS || V || align=right | 1.2 km || 
|-id=492 bgcolor=#fefefe
| 153492 ||  || — || September 11, 2001 || Anderson Mesa || LONEOS || V || align=right | 1.5 km || 
|-id=493 bgcolor=#fefefe
| 153493 ||  || — || September 12, 2001 || Socorro || LINEAR || — || align=right | 1.6 km || 
|-id=494 bgcolor=#fefefe
| 153494 ||  || — || September 12, 2001 || Socorro || LINEAR || — || align=right | 1.2 km || 
|-id=495 bgcolor=#E9E9E9
| 153495 ||  || — || September 12, 2001 || Socorro || LINEAR || — || align=right | 1.5 km || 
|-id=496 bgcolor=#fefefe
| 153496 ||  || — || September 12, 2001 || Socorro || LINEAR || — || align=right | 1.5 km || 
|-id=497 bgcolor=#E9E9E9
| 153497 ||  || — || September 12, 2001 || Socorro || LINEAR || — || align=right | 2.7 km || 
|-id=498 bgcolor=#E9E9E9
| 153498 ||  || — || September 12, 2001 || Socorro || LINEAR || — || align=right | 3.9 km || 
|-id=499 bgcolor=#fefefe
| 153499 ||  || — || September 12, 2001 || Socorro || LINEAR || NYS || align=right | 1.1 km || 
|-id=500 bgcolor=#C2FFFF
| 153500 ||  || — || September 12, 2001 || Socorro || LINEAR || L5 || align=right | 14 km || 
|}

153501–153600 

|-bgcolor=#fefefe
| 153501 ||  || — || September 12, 2001 || Socorro || LINEAR || — || align=right | 3.1 km || 
|-id=502 bgcolor=#fefefe
| 153502 ||  || — || September 12, 2001 || Socorro || LINEAR || V || align=right | 1.2 km || 
|-id=503 bgcolor=#fefefe
| 153503 ||  || — || September 12, 2001 || Socorro || LINEAR || — || align=right | 1.3 km || 
|-id=504 bgcolor=#fefefe
| 153504 ||  || — || September 12, 2001 || Socorro || LINEAR || — || align=right | 1.3 km || 
|-id=505 bgcolor=#fefefe
| 153505 ||  || — || September 12, 2001 || Socorro || LINEAR || MAS || align=right | 1.7 km || 
|-id=506 bgcolor=#E9E9E9
| 153506 ||  || — || September 12, 2001 || Socorro || LINEAR || — || align=right | 1.4 km || 
|-id=507 bgcolor=#fefefe
| 153507 ||  || — || September 12, 2001 || Socorro || LINEAR || — || align=right | 1.6 km || 
|-id=508 bgcolor=#fefefe
| 153508 ||  || — || September 12, 2001 || Socorro || LINEAR || NYS || align=right | 1.0 km || 
|-id=509 bgcolor=#E9E9E9
| 153509 ||  || — || September 12, 2001 || Socorro || LINEAR || — || align=right | 2.1 km || 
|-id=510 bgcolor=#fefefe
| 153510 ||  || — || September 8, 2001 || Socorro || LINEAR || — || align=right | 1.8 km || 
|-id=511 bgcolor=#fefefe
| 153511 ||  || — || September 9, 2001 || Palomar || NEAT || — || align=right | 1.5 km || 
|-id=512 bgcolor=#E9E9E9
| 153512 ||  || — || September 17, 2001 || Desert Eagle || W. K. Y. Yeung || — || align=right | 2.6 km || 
|-id=513 bgcolor=#fefefe
| 153513 ||  || — || September 18, 2001 || Kitt Peak || Spacewatch || — || align=right | 2.9 km || 
|-id=514 bgcolor=#fefefe
| 153514 ||  || — || September 18, 2001 || Kitt Peak || Spacewatch || — || align=right | 1.0 km || 
|-id=515 bgcolor=#fefefe
| 153515 ||  || — || September 16, 2001 || Socorro || LINEAR || — || align=right | 1.8 km || 
|-id=516 bgcolor=#fefefe
| 153516 ||  || — || September 16, 2001 || Socorro || LINEAR || — || align=right | 1.6 km || 
|-id=517 bgcolor=#fefefe
| 153517 ||  || — || September 16, 2001 || Socorro || LINEAR || — || align=right | 1.6 km || 
|-id=518 bgcolor=#fefefe
| 153518 ||  || — || September 16, 2001 || Socorro || LINEAR || NYS || align=right data-sort-value="0.89" | 890 m || 
|-id=519 bgcolor=#fefefe
| 153519 ||  || — || September 16, 2001 || Socorro || LINEAR || NYS || align=right data-sort-value="0.96" | 960 m || 
|-id=520 bgcolor=#fefefe
| 153520 ||  || — || September 16, 2001 || Socorro || LINEAR || — || align=right | 1.5 km || 
|-id=521 bgcolor=#E9E9E9
| 153521 ||  || — || September 16, 2001 || Socorro || LINEAR || — || align=right | 1.2 km || 
|-id=522 bgcolor=#fefefe
| 153522 ||  || — || September 16, 2001 || Socorro || LINEAR || — || align=right | 1.4 km || 
|-id=523 bgcolor=#E9E9E9
| 153523 ||  || — || September 16, 2001 || Socorro || LINEAR || — || align=right | 2.0 km || 
|-id=524 bgcolor=#E9E9E9
| 153524 ||  || — || September 16, 2001 || Socorro || LINEAR || — || align=right | 2.0 km || 
|-id=525 bgcolor=#E9E9E9
| 153525 ||  || — || September 16, 2001 || Socorro || LINEAR || — || align=right | 1.2 km || 
|-id=526 bgcolor=#fefefe
| 153526 ||  || — || September 16, 2001 || Socorro || LINEAR || NYS || align=right | 1.1 km || 
|-id=527 bgcolor=#fefefe
| 153527 ||  || — || September 16, 2001 || Socorro || LINEAR || V || align=right | 1.5 km || 
|-id=528 bgcolor=#E9E9E9
| 153528 ||  || — || September 16, 2001 || Socorro || LINEAR || — || align=right | 1.7 km || 
|-id=529 bgcolor=#fefefe
| 153529 ||  || — || September 16, 2001 || Socorro || LINEAR || — || align=right | 3.0 km || 
|-id=530 bgcolor=#E9E9E9
| 153530 ||  || — || September 17, 2001 || Socorro || LINEAR || — || align=right | 1.5 km || 
|-id=531 bgcolor=#E9E9E9
| 153531 ||  || — || September 17, 2001 || Socorro || LINEAR || — || align=right | 1.9 km || 
|-id=532 bgcolor=#fefefe
| 153532 ||  || — || September 17, 2001 || Socorro || LINEAR || — || align=right | 1.2 km || 
|-id=533 bgcolor=#E9E9E9
| 153533 ||  || — || September 17, 2001 || Socorro || LINEAR || — || align=right | 2.5 km || 
|-id=534 bgcolor=#fefefe
| 153534 ||  || — || September 17, 2001 || Socorro || LINEAR || — || align=right | 1.6 km || 
|-id=535 bgcolor=#fefefe
| 153535 ||  || — || September 17, 2001 || Socorro || LINEAR || — || align=right | 1.4 km || 
|-id=536 bgcolor=#fefefe
| 153536 ||  || — || September 20, 2001 || Socorro || LINEAR || V || align=right data-sort-value="0.81" | 810 m || 
|-id=537 bgcolor=#fefefe
| 153537 ||  || — || September 20, 2001 || Socorro || LINEAR || — || align=right | 1.5 km || 
|-id=538 bgcolor=#fefefe
| 153538 ||  || — || September 20, 2001 || Socorro || LINEAR || ERI || align=right | 2.8 km || 
|-id=539 bgcolor=#E9E9E9
| 153539 ||  || — || September 20, 2001 || Socorro || LINEAR || — || align=right | 1.8 km || 
|-id=540 bgcolor=#fefefe
| 153540 ||  || — || September 20, 2001 || Socorro || LINEAR || NYS || align=right | 1.0 km || 
|-id=541 bgcolor=#fefefe
| 153541 ||  || — || September 20, 2001 || Socorro || LINEAR || — || align=right | 1.8 km || 
|-id=542 bgcolor=#FA8072
| 153542 ||  || — || September 20, 2001 || Socorro || LINEAR || unusual || align=right | 4.7 km || 
|-id=543 bgcolor=#fefefe
| 153543 ||  || — || September 20, 2001 || Socorro || LINEAR || — || align=right | 2.0 km || 
|-id=544 bgcolor=#fefefe
| 153544 ||  || — || September 18, 2001 || Desert Eagle || W. K. Y. Yeung || V || align=right | 1.4 km || 
|-id=545 bgcolor=#fefefe
| 153545 ||  || — || September 20, 2001 || Desert Eagle || W. K. Y. Yeung || — || align=right | 1.4 km || 
|-id=546 bgcolor=#E9E9E9
| 153546 ||  || — || September 20, 2001 || Desert Eagle || W. K. Y. Yeung || KON || align=right | 6.0 km || 
|-id=547 bgcolor=#fefefe
| 153547 ||  || — || September 16, 2001 || Socorro || LINEAR || — || align=right | 1.3 km || 
|-id=548 bgcolor=#fefefe
| 153548 ||  || — || September 16, 2001 || Socorro || LINEAR || — || align=right | 1.3 km || 
|-id=549 bgcolor=#E9E9E9
| 153549 ||  || — || September 16, 2001 || Socorro || LINEAR || — || align=right | 2.4 km || 
|-id=550 bgcolor=#fefefe
| 153550 ||  || — || September 16, 2001 || Socorro || LINEAR || V || align=right | 1.2 km || 
|-id=551 bgcolor=#fefefe
| 153551 ||  || — || September 16, 2001 || Socorro || LINEAR || FLO || align=right | 1.4 km || 
|-id=552 bgcolor=#E9E9E9
| 153552 ||  || — || September 16, 2001 || Socorro || LINEAR || — || align=right | 1.6 km || 
|-id=553 bgcolor=#fefefe
| 153553 ||  || — || September 16, 2001 || Socorro || LINEAR || — || align=right | 1.3 km || 
|-id=554 bgcolor=#fefefe
| 153554 ||  || — || September 16, 2001 || Socorro || LINEAR || NYS || align=right data-sort-value="0.98" | 980 m || 
|-id=555 bgcolor=#E9E9E9
| 153555 ||  || — || September 16, 2001 || Socorro || LINEAR || — || align=right | 1.3 km || 
|-id=556 bgcolor=#fefefe
| 153556 ||  || — || September 16, 2001 || Socorro || LINEAR || — || align=right | 1.4 km || 
|-id=557 bgcolor=#fefefe
| 153557 ||  || — || September 16, 2001 || Socorro || LINEAR || NYS || align=right | 1.0 km || 
|-id=558 bgcolor=#fefefe
| 153558 ||  || — || September 16, 2001 || Socorro || LINEAR || — || align=right | 2.0 km || 
|-id=559 bgcolor=#E9E9E9
| 153559 ||  || — || September 16, 2001 || Socorro || LINEAR || — || align=right | 1.2 km || 
|-id=560 bgcolor=#fefefe
| 153560 ||  || — || September 17, 2001 || Socorro || LINEAR || V || align=right | 1.2 km || 
|-id=561 bgcolor=#fefefe
| 153561 ||  || — || September 17, 2001 || Socorro || LINEAR || NYS || align=right | 1.4 km || 
|-id=562 bgcolor=#fefefe
| 153562 ||  || — || September 17, 2001 || Socorro || LINEAR || V || align=right | 1.5 km || 
|-id=563 bgcolor=#fefefe
| 153563 ||  || — || September 17, 2001 || Socorro || LINEAR || — || align=right | 2.0 km || 
|-id=564 bgcolor=#d6d6d6
| 153564 ||  || — || September 17, 2001 || Socorro || LINEAR || — || align=right | 4.7 km || 
|-id=565 bgcolor=#fefefe
| 153565 ||  || — || September 17, 2001 || Socorro || LINEAR || V || align=right | 1.3 km || 
|-id=566 bgcolor=#E9E9E9
| 153566 ||  || — || September 17, 2001 || Socorro || LINEAR || — || align=right | 1.9 km || 
|-id=567 bgcolor=#E9E9E9
| 153567 ||  || — || September 17, 2001 || Socorro || LINEAR || — || align=right | 2.8 km || 
|-id=568 bgcolor=#fefefe
| 153568 ||  || — || September 19, 2001 || Socorro || LINEAR || NYS || align=right data-sort-value="0.79" | 790 m || 
|-id=569 bgcolor=#fefefe
| 153569 ||  || — || September 16, 2001 || Socorro || LINEAR || — || align=right | 1.4 km || 
|-id=570 bgcolor=#fefefe
| 153570 ||  || — || September 19, 2001 || Socorro || LINEAR || — || align=right | 1.4 km || 
|-id=571 bgcolor=#fefefe
| 153571 ||  || — || September 19, 2001 || Socorro || LINEAR || — || align=right | 1.1 km || 
|-id=572 bgcolor=#fefefe
| 153572 ||  || — || September 19, 2001 || Socorro || LINEAR || MAS || align=right | 1.1 km || 
|-id=573 bgcolor=#fefefe
| 153573 ||  || — || September 19, 2001 || Socorro || LINEAR || NYS || align=right | 1.2 km || 
|-id=574 bgcolor=#E9E9E9
| 153574 ||  || — || September 19, 2001 || Socorro || LINEAR || — || align=right | 1.2 km || 
|-id=575 bgcolor=#fefefe
| 153575 ||  || — || September 19, 2001 || Socorro || LINEAR || NYS || align=right | 1.0 km || 
|-id=576 bgcolor=#fefefe
| 153576 ||  || — || September 19, 2001 || Socorro || LINEAR || NYS || align=right | 1.7 km || 
|-id=577 bgcolor=#fefefe
| 153577 ||  || — || September 19, 2001 || Socorro || LINEAR || — || align=right | 1.6 km || 
|-id=578 bgcolor=#E9E9E9
| 153578 ||  || — || September 19, 2001 || Socorro || LINEAR || — || align=right | 1.5 km || 
|-id=579 bgcolor=#fefefe
| 153579 ||  || — || September 19, 2001 || Socorro || LINEAR || MAS || align=right | 1.0 km || 
|-id=580 bgcolor=#fefefe
| 153580 ||  || — || September 19, 2001 || Socorro || LINEAR || — || align=right | 1.1 km || 
|-id=581 bgcolor=#fefefe
| 153581 ||  || — || September 19, 2001 || Socorro || LINEAR || V || align=right | 1.5 km || 
|-id=582 bgcolor=#fefefe
| 153582 ||  || — || September 19, 2001 || Socorro || LINEAR || MAS || align=right | 1.1 km || 
|-id=583 bgcolor=#fefefe
| 153583 ||  || — || September 19, 2001 || Socorro || LINEAR || V || align=right data-sort-value="0.91" | 910 m || 
|-id=584 bgcolor=#fefefe
| 153584 ||  || — || September 19, 2001 || Socorro || LINEAR || V || align=right | 1.2 km || 
|-id=585 bgcolor=#fefefe
| 153585 ||  || — || September 19, 2001 || Socorro || LINEAR || — || align=right | 1.4 km || 
|-id=586 bgcolor=#fefefe
| 153586 ||  || — || September 19, 2001 || Socorro || LINEAR || MAS || align=right | 1.2 km || 
|-id=587 bgcolor=#E9E9E9
| 153587 ||  || — || September 19, 2001 || Socorro || LINEAR || — || align=right | 1.4 km || 
|-id=588 bgcolor=#fefefe
| 153588 ||  || — || September 19, 2001 || Socorro || LINEAR || — || align=right | 1.7 km || 
|-id=589 bgcolor=#fefefe
| 153589 ||  || — || September 19, 2001 || Socorro || LINEAR || — || align=right | 4.3 km || 
|-id=590 bgcolor=#E9E9E9
| 153590 ||  || — || September 19, 2001 || Socorro || LINEAR || — || align=right | 1.9 km || 
|-id=591 bgcolor=#FFC2E0
| 153591 ||  || — || September 20, 2001 || Socorro || LINEAR || AMO +1kmPHAmoon || align=right | 2.0 km || 
|-id=592 bgcolor=#fefefe
| 153592 ||  || — || September 25, 2001 || Desert Eagle || W. K. Y. Yeung || — || align=right | 1.1 km || 
|-id=593 bgcolor=#fefefe
| 153593 ||  || — || September 19, 2001 || Kitt Peak || Spacewatch || — || align=right data-sort-value="0.89" | 890 m || 
|-id=594 bgcolor=#E9E9E9
| 153594 ||  || — || September 20, 2001 || Socorro || LINEAR || — || align=right | 1.2 km || 
|-id=595 bgcolor=#fefefe
| 153595 ||  || — || September 20, 2001 || Socorro || LINEAR || NYS || align=right | 1.1 km || 
|-id=596 bgcolor=#E9E9E9
| 153596 ||  || — || September 21, 2001 || Palomar || NEAT || — || align=right | 3.3 km || 
|-id=597 bgcolor=#E9E9E9
| 153597 ||  || — || September 21, 2001 || Anderson Mesa || LONEOS || — || align=right | 3.0 km || 
|-id=598 bgcolor=#fefefe
| 153598 ||  || — || September 21, 2001 || Anderson Mesa || LONEOS || NYS || align=right | 1.7 km || 
|-id=599 bgcolor=#E9E9E9
| 153599 ||  || — || September 21, 2001 || Anderson Mesa || LONEOS || — || align=right | 2.6 km || 
|-id=600 bgcolor=#fefefe
| 153600 ||  || — || September 21, 2001 || Anderson Mesa || LONEOS || NYS || align=right | 4.0 km || 
|}

153601–153700 

|-bgcolor=#E9E9E9
| 153601 ||  || — || September 21, 2001 || Anderson Mesa || LONEOS || — || align=right | 1.8 km || 
|-id=602 bgcolor=#fefefe
| 153602 ||  || — || September 21, 2001 || Kitt Peak || Spacewatch || MAS || align=right data-sort-value="0.83" | 830 m || 
|-id=603 bgcolor=#d6d6d6
| 153603 ||  || — || September 22, 2001 || Kitt Peak || Spacewatch || — || align=right | 3.3 km || 
|-id=604 bgcolor=#fefefe
| 153604 ||  || — || September 16, 2001 || Socorro || LINEAR || V || align=right | 1.2 km || 
|-id=605 bgcolor=#fefefe
| 153605 ||  || — || September 22, 2001 || Socorro || LINEAR || CLA || align=right | 2.7 km || 
|-id=606 bgcolor=#fefefe
| 153606 ||  || — || September 21, 2001 || Socorro || LINEAR || V || align=right | 1.3 km || 
|-id=607 bgcolor=#E9E9E9
| 153607 ||  || — || September 25, 2001 || Socorro || LINEAR || — || align=right | 3.0 km || 
|-id=608 bgcolor=#fefefe
| 153608 ||  || — || September 21, 2001 || Socorro || LINEAR || V || align=right | 1.1 km || 
|-id=609 bgcolor=#fefefe
| 153609 ||  || — || September 19, 2001 || Socorro || LINEAR || — || align=right | 1.2 km || 
|-id=610 bgcolor=#E9E9E9
| 153610 ||  || — || September 20, 2001 || Socorro || LINEAR || — || align=right | 1.5 km || 
|-id=611 bgcolor=#fefefe
| 153611 ||  || — || September 21, 2001 || Anderson Mesa || LONEOS || — || align=right | 2.2 km || 
|-id=612 bgcolor=#E9E9E9
| 153612 ||  || — || September 22, 2001 || Palomar || NEAT || MAR || align=right | 1.5 km || 
|-id=613 bgcolor=#E9E9E9
| 153613 ||  || — || October 10, 2001 || Kitt Peak || Spacewatch || — || align=right | 1.2 km || 
|-id=614 bgcolor=#fefefe
| 153614 ||  || — || October 7, 2001 || Palomar || NEAT || — || align=right | 3.1 km || 
|-id=615 bgcolor=#E9E9E9
| 153615 ||  || — || October 13, 2001 || Socorro || LINEAR || — || align=right | 2.1 km || 
|-id=616 bgcolor=#E9E9E9
| 153616 ||  || — || October 14, 2001 || Ondřejov || P. Pravec, P. Kušnirák || HNS || align=right | 2.5 km || 
|-id=617 bgcolor=#fefefe
| 153617 ||  || — || October 14, 2001 || Desert Eagle || W. K. Y. Yeung || — || align=right | 1.5 km || 
|-id=618 bgcolor=#E9E9E9
| 153618 ||  || — || October 9, 2001 || Socorro || LINEAR || — || align=right | 2.5 km || 
|-id=619 bgcolor=#fefefe
| 153619 ||  || — || October 9, 2001 || Socorro || LINEAR || — || align=right | 2.2 km || 
|-id=620 bgcolor=#E9E9E9
| 153620 ||  || — || October 9, 2001 || Socorro || LINEAR || EUN || align=right | 3.0 km || 
|-id=621 bgcolor=#E9E9E9
| 153621 ||  || — || October 9, 2001 || Socorro || LINEAR || EUN || align=right | 2.5 km || 
|-id=622 bgcolor=#E9E9E9
| 153622 ||  || — || October 14, 2001 || Socorro || LINEAR || — || align=right | 2.9 km || 
|-id=623 bgcolor=#E9E9E9
| 153623 ||  || — || October 14, 2001 || Socorro || LINEAR || — || align=right | 1.9 km || 
|-id=624 bgcolor=#E9E9E9
| 153624 ||  || — || October 14, 2001 || Socorro || LINEAR || — || align=right | 3.8 km || 
|-id=625 bgcolor=#E9E9E9
| 153625 ||  || — || October 14, 2001 || Socorro || LINEAR || GER || align=right | 2.0 km || 
|-id=626 bgcolor=#fefefe
| 153626 ||  || — || October 14, 2001 || Socorro || LINEAR || — || align=right | 2.5 km || 
|-id=627 bgcolor=#E9E9E9
| 153627 ||  || — || October 15, 2001 || Socorro || LINEAR || HNS || align=right | 1.5 km || 
|-id=628 bgcolor=#E9E9E9
| 153628 ||  || — || October 9, 2001 || Kitt Peak || Spacewatch || — || align=right | 1.8 km || 
|-id=629 bgcolor=#fefefe
| 153629 ||  || — || October 14, 2001 || Socorro || LINEAR || — || align=right | 1.6 km || 
|-id=630 bgcolor=#E9E9E9
| 153630 ||  || — || October 11, 2001 || Socorro || LINEAR || — || align=right | 1.6 km || 
|-id=631 bgcolor=#E9E9E9
| 153631 ||  || — || October 13, 2001 || Socorro || LINEAR || — || align=right | 1.8 km || 
|-id=632 bgcolor=#fefefe
| 153632 ||  || — || October 13, 2001 || Socorro || LINEAR || — || align=right | 1.3 km || 
|-id=633 bgcolor=#fefefe
| 153633 ||  || — || October 13, 2001 || Socorro || LINEAR || NYS || align=right | 1.4 km || 
|-id=634 bgcolor=#fefefe
| 153634 ||  || — || October 13, 2001 || Socorro || LINEAR || MAS || align=right | 1.6 km || 
|-id=635 bgcolor=#E9E9E9
| 153635 ||  || — || October 13, 2001 || Socorro || LINEAR || — || align=right | 3.5 km || 
|-id=636 bgcolor=#E9E9E9
| 153636 ||  || — || October 13, 2001 || Socorro || LINEAR || — || align=right | 2.0 km || 
|-id=637 bgcolor=#d6d6d6
| 153637 ||  || — || October 13, 2001 || Socorro || LINEAR || KOR || align=right | 3.1 km || 
|-id=638 bgcolor=#E9E9E9
| 153638 ||  || — || October 13, 2001 || Socorro || LINEAR || — || align=right | 2.5 km || 
|-id=639 bgcolor=#E9E9E9
| 153639 ||  || — || October 13, 2001 || Socorro || LINEAR || — || align=right | 1.9 km || 
|-id=640 bgcolor=#E9E9E9
| 153640 ||  || — || October 13, 2001 || Socorro || LINEAR || — || align=right | 1.7 km || 
|-id=641 bgcolor=#E9E9E9
| 153641 ||  || — || October 13, 2001 || Socorro || LINEAR || — || align=right | 3.7 km || 
|-id=642 bgcolor=#fefefe
| 153642 ||  || — || October 13, 2001 || Socorro || LINEAR || NYS || align=right | 4.7 km || 
|-id=643 bgcolor=#d6d6d6
| 153643 ||  || — || October 14, 2001 || Socorro || LINEAR || TEL || align=right | 2.1 km || 
|-id=644 bgcolor=#fefefe
| 153644 ||  || — || October 14, 2001 || Socorro || LINEAR || — || align=right | 1.6 km || 
|-id=645 bgcolor=#E9E9E9
| 153645 ||  || — || October 14, 2001 || Socorro || LINEAR || — || align=right | 1.2 km || 
|-id=646 bgcolor=#fefefe
| 153646 ||  || — || October 14, 2001 || Socorro || LINEAR || — || align=right | 1.1 km || 
|-id=647 bgcolor=#E9E9E9
| 153647 ||  || — || October 14, 2001 || Socorro || LINEAR || — || align=right | 2.0 km || 
|-id=648 bgcolor=#E9E9E9
| 153648 ||  || — || October 14, 2001 || Socorro || LINEAR || — || align=right | 3.7 km || 
|-id=649 bgcolor=#E9E9E9
| 153649 ||  || — || October 15, 2001 || Socorro || LINEAR || — || align=right | 2.5 km || 
|-id=650 bgcolor=#E9E9E9
| 153650 ||  || — || October 15, 2001 || Socorro || LINEAR || — || align=right | 2.3 km || 
|-id=651 bgcolor=#fefefe
| 153651 ||  || — || October 15, 2001 || Socorro || LINEAR || SUL || align=right | 3.6 km || 
|-id=652 bgcolor=#E9E9E9
| 153652 ||  || — || October 15, 2001 || Socorro || LINEAR || — || align=right | 4.4 km || 
|-id=653 bgcolor=#E9E9E9
| 153653 ||  || — || October 15, 2001 || Desert Eagle || W. K. Y. Yeung || — || align=right | 1.5 km || 
|-id=654 bgcolor=#fefefe
| 153654 ||  || — || October 14, 2001 || Socorro || LINEAR || NYS || align=right | 1.1 km || 
|-id=655 bgcolor=#E9E9E9
| 153655 ||  || — || October 15, 2001 || Socorro || LINEAR || GER || align=right | 2.2 km || 
|-id=656 bgcolor=#E9E9E9
| 153656 ||  || — || October 15, 2001 || Socorro || LINEAR || — || align=right | 2.3 km || 
|-id=657 bgcolor=#E9E9E9
| 153657 ||  || — || October 8, 2001 || Palomar || NEAT || — || align=right | 3.0 km || 
|-id=658 bgcolor=#fefefe
| 153658 ||  || — || October 12, 2001 || Haleakala || NEAT || — || align=right | 1.7 km || 
|-id=659 bgcolor=#E9E9E9
| 153659 ||  || — || October 10, 2001 || Palomar || NEAT || — || align=right | 1.4 km || 
|-id=660 bgcolor=#E9E9E9
| 153660 ||  || — || October 10, 2001 || Palomar || NEAT || EUN || align=right | 2.3 km || 
|-id=661 bgcolor=#E9E9E9
| 153661 ||  || — || October 10, 2001 || Palomar || NEAT || — || align=right | 1.6 km || 
|-id=662 bgcolor=#E9E9E9
| 153662 ||  || — || October 10, 2001 || Palomar || NEAT || — || align=right | 2.0 km || 
|-id=663 bgcolor=#E9E9E9
| 153663 ||  || — || October 10, 2001 || Palomar || NEAT || — || align=right | 1.3 km || 
|-id=664 bgcolor=#E9E9E9
| 153664 ||  || — || October 10, 2001 || Palomar || NEAT || — || align=right | 2.1 km || 
|-id=665 bgcolor=#E9E9E9
| 153665 ||  || — || October 11, 2001 || Palomar || NEAT || — || align=right | 1.5 km || 
|-id=666 bgcolor=#E9E9E9
| 153666 ||  || — || October 15, 2001 || Socorro || LINEAR || — || align=right | 3.0 km || 
|-id=667 bgcolor=#E9E9E9
| 153667 ||  || — || October 14, 2001 || Socorro || LINEAR || — || align=right | 1.3 km || 
|-id=668 bgcolor=#E9E9E9
| 153668 ||  || — || October 14, 2001 || Socorro || LINEAR || — || align=right | 2.3 km || 
|-id=669 bgcolor=#fefefe
| 153669 ||  || — || October 14, 2001 || Socorro || LINEAR || — || align=right | 3.3 km || 
|-id=670 bgcolor=#fefefe
| 153670 ||  || — || October 14, 2001 || Socorro || LINEAR || NYS || align=right data-sort-value="0.95" | 950 m || 
|-id=671 bgcolor=#E9E9E9
| 153671 ||  || — || October 14, 2001 || Socorro || LINEAR || — || align=right | 2.0 km || 
|-id=672 bgcolor=#fefefe
| 153672 ||  || — || October 14, 2001 || Socorro || LINEAR || V || align=right | 1.7 km || 
|-id=673 bgcolor=#E9E9E9
| 153673 ||  || — || October 14, 2001 || Socorro || LINEAR || — || align=right | 1.7 km || 
|-id=674 bgcolor=#fefefe
| 153674 ||  || — || October 14, 2001 || Socorro || LINEAR || — || align=right | 1.5 km || 
|-id=675 bgcolor=#fefefe
| 153675 ||  || — || October 14, 2001 || Socorro || LINEAR || V || align=right | 1.2 km || 
|-id=676 bgcolor=#fefefe
| 153676 ||  || — || October 14, 2001 || Socorro || LINEAR || — || align=right | 2.0 km || 
|-id=677 bgcolor=#E9E9E9
| 153677 ||  || — || October 15, 2001 || Socorro || LINEAR || — || align=right | 1.7 km || 
|-id=678 bgcolor=#fefefe
| 153678 ||  || — || October 11, 2001 || Socorro || LINEAR || — || align=right | 1.4 km || 
|-id=679 bgcolor=#E9E9E9
| 153679 ||  || — || October 11, 2001 || Socorro || LINEAR || — || align=right | 2.2 km || 
|-id=680 bgcolor=#E9E9E9
| 153680 ||  || — || October 12, 2001 || Anderson Mesa || LONEOS || — || align=right | 2.2 km || 
|-id=681 bgcolor=#E9E9E9
| 153681 ||  || — || October 12, 2001 || Anderson Mesa || LONEOS || HNS || align=right | 1.9 km || 
|-id=682 bgcolor=#E9E9E9
| 153682 ||  || — || October 14, 2001 || Socorro || LINEAR || MAR || align=right | 1.9 km || 
|-id=683 bgcolor=#fefefe
| 153683 ||  || — || October 14, 2001 || Kitt Peak || Spacewatch || NYS || align=right | 1.5 km || 
|-id=684 bgcolor=#fefefe
| 153684 ||  || — || October 14, 2001 || Anderson Mesa || LONEOS || — || align=right | 1.9 km || 
|-id=685 bgcolor=#E9E9E9
| 153685 ||  || — || October 15, 2001 || Palomar || NEAT || — || align=right | 1.8 km || 
|-id=686 bgcolor=#E9E9E9
| 153686 Pathall ||  ||  || October 14, 2001 || Apache Point || SDSS || MRX || align=right | 1.5 km || 
|-id=687 bgcolor=#fefefe
| 153687 ||  || — || October 16, 2001 || Socorro || LINEAR || — || align=right | 2.8 km || 
|-id=688 bgcolor=#E9E9E9
| 153688 ||  || — || October 17, 2001 || Socorro || LINEAR || — || align=right | 1.1 km || 
|-id=689 bgcolor=#fefefe
| 153689 ||  || — || October 22, 2001 || Desert Eagle || W. K. Y. Yeung || — || align=right | 1.6 km || 
|-id=690 bgcolor=#E9E9E9
| 153690 ||  || — || October 24, 2001 || Desert Eagle || W. K. Y. Yeung || — || align=right | 2.3 km || 
|-id=691 bgcolor=#fefefe
| 153691 ||  || — || October 25, 2001 || Desert Eagle || W. K. Y. Yeung || — || align=right | 1.9 km || 
|-id=692 bgcolor=#FA8072
| 153692 ||  || — || October 25, 2001 || Socorro || LINEAR || — || align=right data-sort-value="0.88" | 880 m || 
|-id=693 bgcolor=#fefefe
| 153693 ||  || — || October 18, 2001 || Socorro || LINEAR || — || align=right | 4.5 km || 
|-id=694 bgcolor=#fefefe
| 153694 ||  || — || October 16, 2001 || Socorro || LINEAR || NYS || align=right | 1.0 km || 
|-id=695 bgcolor=#E9E9E9
| 153695 ||  || — || October 16, 2001 || Socorro || LINEAR || — || align=right | 2.1 km || 
|-id=696 bgcolor=#E9E9E9
| 153696 ||  || — || October 16, 2001 || Socorro || LINEAR || — || align=right | 2.8 km || 
|-id=697 bgcolor=#E9E9E9
| 153697 ||  || — || October 17, 2001 || Socorro || LINEAR || — || align=right | 1.6 km || 
|-id=698 bgcolor=#fefefe
| 153698 ||  || — || October 17, 2001 || Socorro || LINEAR || V || align=right | 1.4 km || 
|-id=699 bgcolor=#fefefe
| 153699 ||  || — || October 17, 2001 || Socorro || LINEAR || MAS || align=right | 1.3 km || 
|-id=700 bgcolor=#fefefe
| 153700 ||  || — || October 17, 2001 || Socorro || LINEAR || V || align=right | 1.1 km || 
|}

153701–153800 

|-bgcolor=#E9E9E9
| 153701 ||  || — || October 17, 2001 || Socorro || LINEAR || — || align=right | 1.5 km || 
|-id=702 bgcolor=#fefefe
| 153702 ||  || — || October 17, 2001 || Socorro || LINEAR || — || align=right | 2.8 km || 
|-id=703 bgcolor=#E9E9E9
| 153703 ||  || — || October 17, 2001 || Socorro || LINEAR || — || align=right | 1.6 km || 
|-id=704 bgcolor=#E9E9E9
| 153704 ||  || — || October 17, 2001 || Socorro || LINEAR || — || align=right | 2.4 km || 
|-id=705 bgcolor=#fefefe
| 153705 ||  || — || October 17, 2001 || Socorro || LINEAR || — || align=right | 1.3 km || 
|-id=706 bgcolor=#fefefe
| 153706 ||  || — || October 17, 2001 || Socorro || LINEAR || — || align=right | 1.4 km || 
|-id=707 bgcolor=#E9E9E9
| 153707 ||  || — || October 17, 2001 || Socorro || LINEAR || — || align=right | 1.7 km || 
|-id=708 bgcolor=#C2FFFF
| 153708 ||  || — || October 17, 2001 || Socorro || LINEAR || L5 || align=right | 15 km || 
|-id=709 bgcolor=#E9E9E9
| 153709 ||  || — || October 20, 2001 || Socorro || LINEAR || — || align=right | 2.7 km || 
|-id=710 bgcolor=#fefefe
| 153710 ||  || — || October 20, 2001 || Socorro || LINEAR || — || align=right | 1.4 km || 
|-id=711 bgcolor=#fefefe
| 153711 ||  || — || October 21, 2001 || Kitt Peak || Spacewatch || — || align=right | 1.1 km || 
|-id=712 bgcolor=#E9E9E9
| 153712 ||  || — || October 18, 2001 || Palomar || NEAT || — || align=right | 2.2 km || 
|-id=713 bgcolor=#fefefe
| 153713 ||  || — || October 16, 2001 || Socorro || LINEAR || — || align=right | 1.3 km || 
|-id=714 bgcolor=#fefefe
| 153714 ||  || — || October 17, 2001 || Socorro || LINEAR || MAS || align=right | 1.0 km || 
|-id=715 bgcolor=#E9E9E9
| 153715 ||  || — || October 17, 2001 || Socorro || LINEAR || — || align=right | 1.2 km || 
|-id=716 bgcolor=#E9E9E9
| 153716 ||  || — || October 17, 2001 || Socorro || LINEAR || — || align=right | 4.6 km || 
|-id=717 bgcolor=#E9E9E9
| 153717 ||  || — || October 20, 2001 || Socorro || LINEAR || — || align=right | 1.5 km || 
|-id=718 bgcolor=#fefefe
| 153718 ||  || — || October 20, 2001 || Socorro || LINEAR || — || align=right | 1.2 km || 
|-id=719 bgcolor=#fefefe
| 153719 ||  || — || October 20, 2001 || Socorro || LINEAR || — || align=right | 1.8 km || 
|-id=720 bgcolor=#E9E9E9
| 153720 ||  || — || October 20, 2001 || Socorro || LINEAR || — || align=right | 1.6 km || 
|-id=721 bgcolor=#E9E9E9
| 153721 ||  || — || October 20, 2001 || Socorro || LINEAR || — || align=right | 3.3 km || 
|-id=722 bgcolor=#E9E9E9
| 153722 ||  || — || October 21, 2001 || Socorro || LINEAR || — || align=right | 1.4 km || 
|-id=723 bgcolor=#E9E9E9
| 153723 ||  || — || October 22, 2001 || Socorro || LINEAR || — || align=right | 1.3 km || 
|-id=724 bgcolor=#E9E9E9
| 153724 ||  || — || October 22, 2001 || Socorro || LINEAR || MAR || align=right | 1.9 km || 
|-id=725 bgcolor=#E9E9E9
| 153725 ||  || — || October 22, 2001 || Socorro || LINEAR || — || align=right | 1.6 km || 
|-id=726 bgcolor=#fefefe
| 153726 ||  || — || October 22, 2001 || Socorro || LINEAR || — || align=right | 3.5 km || 
|-id=727 bgcolor=#E9E9E9
| 153727 ||  || — || October 22, 2001 || Socorro || LINEAR || — || align=right | 2.8 km || 
|-id=728 bgcolor=#E9E9E9
| 153728 ||  || — || October 22, 2001 || Socorro || LINEAR || — || align=right | 1.3 km || 
|-id=729 bgcolor=#fefefe
| 153729 ||  || — || October 22, 2001 || Socorro || LINEAR || NYS || align=right | 1.4 km || 
|-id=730 bgcolor=#E9E9E9
| 153730 ||  || — || October 22, 2001 || Palomar || NEAT || — || align=right | 1.7 km || 
|-id=731 bgcolor=#E9E9E9
| 153731 ||  || — || October 20, 2001 || Socorro || LINEAR || — || align=right | 1.7 km || 
|-id=732 bgcolor=#d6d6d6
| 153732 ||  || — || October 20, 2001 || Socorro || LINEAR || — || align=right | 4.6 km || 
|-id=733 bgcolor=#fefefe
| 153733 ||  || — || October 21, 2001 || Socorro || LINEAR || — || align=right | 1.4 km || 
|-id=734 bgcolor=#E9E9E9
| 153734 ||  || — || October 21, 2001 || Socorro || LINEAR || — || align=right | 3.4 km || 
|-id=735 bgcolor=#fefefe
| 153735 ||  || — || October 23, 2001 || Socorro || LINEAR || — || align=right | 1.5 km || 
|-id=736 bgcolor=#fefefe
| 153736 ||  || — || October 23, 2001 || Socorro || LINEAR || NYS || align=right | 1.0 km || 
|-id=737 bgcolor=#E9E9E9
| 153737 ||  || — || October 23, 2001 || Socorro || LINEAR || — || align=right | 1.6 km || 
|-id=738 bgcolor=#E9E9E9
| 153738 ||  || — || October 23, 2001 || Socorro || LINEAR || — || align=right | 1.3 km || 
|-id=739 bgcolor=#E9E9E9
| 153739 ||  || — || October 23, 2001 || Socorro || LINEAR || — || align=right | 1.6 km || 
|-id=740 bgcolor=#E9E9E9
| 153740 ||  || — || October 23, 2001 || Socorro || LINEAR || — || align=right | 1.3 km || 
|-id=741 bgcolor=#fefefe
| 153741 ||  || — || October 23, 2001 || Socorro || LINEAR || NYS || align=right data-sort-value="0.92" | 920 m || 
|-id=742 bgcolor=#fefefe
| 153742 ||  || — || October 23, 2001 || Socorro || LINEAR || — || align=right | 1.7 km || 
|-id=743 bgcolor=#E9E9E9
| 153743 ||  || — || October 23, 2001 || Socorro || LINEAR || — || align=right | 1.9 km || 
|-id=744 bgcolor=#E9E9E9
| 153744 ||  || — || October 23, 2001 || Socorro || LINEAR || — || align=right | 1.9 km || 
|-id=745 bgcolor=#fefefe
| 153745 ||  || — || October 23, 2001 || Socorro || LINEAR || V || align=right | 1.4 km || 
|-id=746 bgcolor=#E9E9E9
| 153746 ||  || — || October 23, 2001 || Socorro || LINEAR || — || align=right | 2.1 km || 
|-id=747 bgcolor=#E9E9E9
| 153747 ||  || — || October 23, 2001 || Socorro || LINEAR || — || align=right | 1.9 km || 
|-id=748 bgcolor=#fefefe
| 153748 ||  || — || October 23, 2001 || Socorro || LINEAR || NYS || align=right | 1.4 km || 
|-id=749 bgcolor=#E9E9E9
| 153749 ||  || — || October 19, 2001 || Socorro || LINEAR || — || align=right | 2.8 km || 
|-id=750 bgcolor=#E9E9E9
| 153750 ||  || — || October 19, 2001 || Socorro || LINEAR || — || align=right | 2.4 km || 
|-id=751 bgcolor=#fefefe
| 153751 ||  || — || October 19, 2001 || Socorro || LINEAR || — || align=right | 3.2 km || 
|-id=752 bgcolor=#fefefe
| 153752 ||  || — || October 18, 2001 || Palomar || NEAT || NYS || align=right | 1.3 km || 
|-id=753 bgcolor=#E9E9E9
| 153753 ||  || — || October 16, 2001 || Palomar || NEAT || — || align=right | 1.6 km || 
|-id=754 bgcolor=#E9E9E9
| 153754 ||  || — || October 18, 2001 || Palomar || NEAT || — || align=right | 3.2 km || 
|-id=755 bgcolor=#C2FFFF
| 153755 ||  || — || October 19, 2001 || Palomar || NEAT || L5 || align=right | 11 km || 
|-id=756 bgcolor=#E9E9E9
| 153756 ||  || — || October 19, 2001 || Palomar || NEAT || — || align=right | 1.2 km || 
|-id=757 bgcolor=#C2FFFF
| 153757 ||  || — || October 21, 2001 || Emerald Lane || L. Ball || L5 || align=right | 11 km || 
|-id=758 bgcolor=#C2FFFF
| 153758 ||  || — || October 23, 2001 || Socorro || LINEAR || L5 || align=right | 15 km || 
|-id=759 bgcolor=#E9E9E9
| 153759 ||  || — || October 24, 2001 || Kitt Peak || Spacewatch || — || align=right | 1.5 km || 
|-id=760 bgcolor=#fefefe
| 153760 ||  || — || October 23, 2001 || Socorro || LINEAR || — || align=right | 1.3 km || 
|-id=761 bgcolor=#E9E9E9
| 153761 ||  || — || October 25, 2001 || Socorro || LINEAR || — || align=right | 3.0 km || 
|-id=762 bgcolor=#fefefe
| 153762 ||  || — || November 9, 2001 || Palomar || NEAT || V || align=right | 1.1 km || 
|-id=763 bgcolor=#E9E9E9
| 153763 ||  || — || November 10, 2001 || Socorro || LINEAR || — || align=right | 3.5 km || 
|-id=764 bgcolor=#E9E9E9
| 153764 ||  || — || November 10, 2001 || Socorro || LINEAR || RAF || align=right | 1.5 km || 
|-id=765 bgcolor=#E9E9E9
| 153765 ||  || — || November 10, 2001 || Socorro || LINEAR || RAF || align=right | 1.9 km || 
|-id=766 bgcolor=#E9E9E9
| 153766 ||  || — || November 10, 2001 || Socorro || LINEAR || — || align=right | 1.8 km || 
|-id=767 bgcolor=#E9E9E9
| 153767 ||  || — || November 9, 2001 || Socorro || LINEAR || — || align=right | 2.0 km || 
|-id=768 bgcolor=#E9E9E9
| 153768 ||  || — || November 9, 2001 || Socorro || LINEAR || — || align=right | 2.8 km || 
|-id=769 bgcolor=#E9E9E9
| 153769 ||  || — || November 9, 2001 || Socorro || LINEAR || — || align=right | 2.5 km || 
|-id=770 bgcolor=#E9E9E9
| 153770 ||  || — || November 9, 2001 || Socorro || LINEAR || — || align=right | 2.5 km || 
|-id=771 bgcolor=#E9E9E9
| 153771 ||  || — || November 9, 2001 || Socorro || LINEAR || MAR || align=right | 2.4 km || 
|-id=772 bgcolor=#E9E9E9
| 153772 ||  || — || November 9, 2001 || Socorro || LINEAR || — || align=right | 2.2 km || 
|-id=773 bgcolor=#E9E9E9
| 153773 ||  || — || November 9, 2001 || Socorro || LINEAR || — || align=right | 1.5 km || 
|-id=774 bgcolor=#fefefe
| 153774 ||  || — || November 9, 2001 || Socorro || LINEAR || NYS || align=right | 1.3 km || 
|-id=775 bgcolor=#fefefe
| 153775 ||  || — || November 9, 2001 || Socorro || LINEAR || MAS || align=right | 1.3 km || 
|-id=776 bgcolor=#E9E9E9
| 153776 ||  || — || November 9, 2001 || Socorro || LINEAR || — || align=right | 3.6 km || 
|-id=777 bgcolor=#E9E9E9
| 153777 ||  || — || November 9, 2001 || Socorro || LINEAR || MAR || align=right | 2.4 km || 
|-id=778 bgcolor=#E9E9E9
| 153778 ||  || — || November 9, 2001 || Socorro || LINEAR || — || align=right | 2.9 km || 
|-id=779 bgcolor=#fefefe
| 153779 ||  || — || November 10, 2001 || Socorro || LINEAR || — || align=right | 2.7 km || 
|-id=780 bgcolor=#E9E9E9
| 153780 ||  || — || November 10, 2001 || Socorro || LINEAR || — || align=right | 1.6 km || 
|-id=781 bgcolor=#E9E9E9
| 153781 ||  || — || November 10, 2001 || Socorro || LINEAR || — || align=right | 1.9 km || 
|-id=782 bgcolor=#E9E9E9
| 153782 ||  || — || November 10, 2001 || Socorro || LINEAR || HNS || align=right | 1.6 km || 
|-id=783 bgcolor=#E9E9E9
| 153783 ||  || — || November 10, 2001 || Socorro || LINEAR || — || align=right | 2.3 km || 
|-id=784 bgcolor=#E9E9E9
| 153784 ||  || — || November 10, 2001 || Socorro || LINEAR || — || align=right | 1.4 km || 
|-id=785 bgcolor=#E9E9E9
| 153785 ||  || — || November 10, 2001 || Socorro || LINEAR || — || align=right | 2.9 km || 
|-id=786 bgcolor=#E9E9E9
| 153786 ||  || — || November 10, 2001 || Socorro || LINEAR || — || align=right | 1.7 km || 
|-id=787 bgcolor=#E9E9E9
| 153787 ||  || — || November 10, 2001 || Socorro || LINEAR || — || align=right | 1.9 km || 
|-id=788 bgcolor=#d6d6d6
| 153788 ||  || — || November 11, 2001 || Socorro || LINEAR || — || align=right | 5.1 km || 
|-id=789 bgcolor=#E9E9E9
| 153789 ||  || — || November 11, 2001 || Socorro || LINEAR || EUN || align=right | 2.2 km || 
|-id=790 bgcolor=#E9E9E9
| 153790 ||  || — || November 11, 2001 || Socorro || LINEAR || — || align=right | 4.8 km || 
|-id=791 bgcolor=#E9E9E9
| 153791 ||  || — || November 11, 2001 || Socorro || LINEAR || — || align=right | 1.6 km || 
|-id=792 bgcolor=#FFC2E0
| 153792 ||  || — || November 12, 2001 || Socorro || LINEAR || APO +1km || align=right data-sort-value="0.85" | 850 m || 
|-id=793 bgcolor=#fefefe
| 153793 ||  || — || November 15, 2001 || Haleakala || NEAT || KLI || align=right | 4.3 km || 
|-id=794 bgcolor=#E9E9E9
| 153794 ||  || — || November 9, 2001 || Palomar || NEAT || — || align=right | 2.6 km || 
|-id=795 bgcolor=#E9E9E9
| 153795 ||  || — || November 9, 2001 || Palomar || NEAT || — || align=right | 2.2 km || 
|-id=796 bgcolor=#E9E9E9
| 153796 ||  || — || November 9, 2001 || Palomar || NEAT || — || align=right | 3.4 km || 
|-id=797 bgcolor=#E9E9E9
| 153797 ||  || — || November 15, 2001 || Socorro || LINEAR || MAR || align=right | 2.2 km || 
|-id=798 bgcolor=#E9E9E9
| 153798 ||  || — || November 15, 2001 || Socorro || LINEAR || ADE || align=right | 2.7 km || 
|-id=799 bgcolor=#E9E9E9
| 153799 ||  || — || November 15, 2001 || Socorro || LINEAR || — || align=right | 3.9 km || 
|-id=800 bgcolor=#E9E9E9
| 153800 ||  || — || November 15, 2001 || Socorro || LINEAR || — || align=right | 3.5 km || 
|}

153801–153900 

|-bgcolor=#E9E9E9
| 153801 ||  || — || November 12, 2001 || Socorro || LINEAR || — || align=right | 1.6 km || 
|-id=802 bgcolor=#fefefe
| 153802 ||  || — || November 12, 2001 || Socorro || LINEAR || MAS || align=right | 1.3 km || 
|-id=803 bgcolor=#E9E9E9
| 153803 ||  || — || November 12, 2001 || Socorro || LINEAR || — || align=right | 2.1 km || 
|-id=804 bgcolor=#fefefe
| 153804 ||  || — || November 12, 2001 || Socorro || LINEAR || NYS || align=right | 1.3 km || 
|-id=805 bgcolor=#E9E9E9
| 153805 ||  || — || November 12, 2001 || Socorro || LINEAR || — || align=right | 1.7 km || 
|-id=806 bgcolor=#fefefe
| 153806 ||  || — || November 12, 2001 || Socorro || LINEAR || NYS || align=right | 1.4 km || 
|-id=807 bgcolor=#E9E9E9
| 153807 ||  || — || November 12, 2001 || Socorro || LINEAR || — || align=right | 2.8 km || 
|-id=808 bgcolor=#E9E9E9
| 153808 ||  || — || November 12, 2001 || Socorro || LINEAR || — || align=right | 2.9 km || 
|-id=809 bgcolor=#E9E9E9
| 153809 ||  || — || November 12, 2001 || Socorro || LINEAR || — || align=right | 3.6 km || 
|-id=810 bgcolor=#E9E9E9
| 153810 ||  || — || November 12, 2001 || Socorro || LINEAR || — || align=right | 2.9 km || 
|-id=811 bgcolor=#E9E9E9
| 153811 ||  || — || November 12, 2001 || Socorro || LINEAR || — || align=right | 1.8 km || 
|-id=812 bgcolor=#E9E9E9
| 153812 ||  || — || November 12, 2001 || Socorro || LINEAR || — || align=right | 3.3 km || 
|-id=813 bgcolor=#E9E9E9
| 153813 || 2001 WE || — || November 16, 2001 || Bisei SG Center || BATTeRS || — || align=right | 1.9 km || 
|-id=814 bgcolor=#FFC2E0
| 153814 ||  || — || November 20, 2001 || Anderson Mesa || LONEOS || APOPHA || align=right data-sort-value="0.93" | 930 m || 
|-id=815 bgcolor=#fefefe
| 153815 ||  || — || November 17, 2001 || Socorro || LINEAR || — || align=right | 1.8 km || 
|-id=816 bgcolor=#fefefe
| 153816 ||  || — || November 17, 2001 || Socorro || LINEAR || NYS || align=right | 1.1 km || 
|-id=817 bgcolor=#fefefe
| 153817 ||  || — || November 17, 2001 || Socorro || LINEAR || V || align=right | 1.2 km || 
|-id=818 bgcolor=#E9E9E9
| 153818 ||  || — || November 17, 2001 || Socorro || LINEAR || — || align=right | 1.8 km || 
|-id=819 bgcolor=#E9E9E9
| 153819 ||  || — || November 17, 2001 || Kitt Peak || Spacewatch || MIS || align=right | 4.0 km || 
|-id=820 bgcolor=#E9E9E9
| 153820 ||  || — || November 17, 2001 || Socorro || LINEAR || — || align=right | 1.3 km || 
|-id=821 bgcolor=#E9E9E9
| 153821 ||  || — || November 17, 2001 || Socorro || LINEAR || VIB || align=right | 2.6 km || 
|-id=822 bgcolor=#E9E9E9
| 153822 ||  || — || November 17, 2001 || Socorro || LINEAR || — || align=right | 1.8 km || 
|-id=823 bgcolor=#E9E9E9
| 153823 ||  || — || November 17, 2001 || Socorro || LINEAR || — || align=right | 1.7 km || 
|-id=824 bgcolor=#E9E9E9
| 153824 ||  || — || November 19, 2001 || Socorro || LINEAR || — || align=right | 1.4 km || 
|-id=825 bgcolor=#E9E9E9
| 153825 ||  || — || November 17, 2001 || Kitt Peak || Spacewatch || — || align=right | 1.4 km || 
|-id=826 bgcolor=#E9E9E9
| 153826 ||  || — || November 17, 2001 || Socorro || LINEAR || — || align=right | 1.0 km || 
|-id=827 bgcolor=#E9E9E9
| 153827 ||  || — || November 19, 2001 || Socorro || LINEAR || — || align=right | 1.7 km || 
|-id=828 bgcolor=#fefefe
| 153828 ||  || — || November 20, 2001 || Socorro || LINEAR || — || align=right | 1.4 km || 
|-id=829 bgcolor=#E9E9E9
| 153829 ||  || — || November 20, 2001 || Socorro || LINEAR || — || align=right | 2.2 km || 
|-id=830 bgcolor=#fefefe
| 153830 ||  || — || November 20, 2001 || Socorro || LINEAR || — || align=right | 1.2 km || 
|-id=831 bgcolor=#E9E9E9
| 153831 ||  || — || November 20, 2001 || Socorro || LINEAR || — || align=right | 1.3 km || 
|-id=832 bgcolor=#fefefe
| 153832 ||  || — || November 16, 2001 || Kitt Peak || Spacewatch || NYS || align=right | 1.4 km || 
|-id=833 bgcolor=#E9E9E9
| 153833 ||  || — || December 9, 2001 || Socorro || LINEAR || — || align=right | 5.3 km || 
|-id=834 bgcolor=#E9E9E9
| 153834 ||  || — || December 7, 2001 || Socorro || LINEAR || — || align=right | 1.4 km || 
|-id=835 bgcolor=#E9E9E9
| 153835 ||  || — || December 9, 2001 || Socorro || LINEAR || — || align=right | 1.7 km || 
|-id=836 bgcolor=#E9E9E9
| 153836 ||  || — || December 9, 2001 || Socorro || LINEAR || ADE || align=right | 3.3 km || 
|-id=837 bgcolor=#fefefe
| 153837 ||  || — || December 9, 2001 || Socorro || LINEAR || KLI || align=right | 3.5 km || 
|-id=838 bgcolor=#E9E9E9
| 153838 ||  || — || December 9, 2001 || Socorro || LINEAR || — || align=right | 2.7 km || 
|-id=839 bgcolor=#E9E9E9
| 153839 ||  || — || December 9, 2001 || Socorro || LINEAR || JUN || align=right | 2.4 km || 
|-id=840 bgcolor=#E9E9E9
| 153840 ||  || — || December 9, 2001 || Socorro || LINEAR || — || align=right | 2.3 km || 
|-id=841 bgcolor=#E9E9E9
| 153841 ||  || — || December 9, 2001 || Socorro || LINEAR || — || align=right | 4.8 km || 
|-id=842 bgcolor=#FFC2E0
| 153842 ||  || — || December 11, 2001 || Socorro || LINEAR || AMO +1km || align=right | 1.8 km || 
|-id=843 bgcolor=#fefefe
| 153843 ||  || — || December 7, 2001 || Kitt Peak || Spacewatch || MAS || align=right | 1.2 km || 
|-id=844 bgcolor=#E9E9E9
| 153844 ||  || — || December 9, 2001 || Socorro || LINEAR || — || align=right | 4.9 km || 
|-id=845 bgcolor=#E9E9E9
| 153845 ||  || — || December 9, 2001 || Socorro || LINEAR || — || align=right | 3.1 km || 
|-id=846 bgcolor=#E9E9E9
| 153846 ||  || — || December 9, 2001 || Socorro || LINEAR || — || align=right | 4.7 km || 
|-id=847 bgcolor=#E9E9E9
| 153847 ||  || — || December 9, 2001 || Socorro || LINEAR || EUN || align=right | 2.1 km || 
|-id=848 bgcolor=#d6d6d6
| 153848 ||  || — || December 9, 2001 || Socorro || LINEAR || — || align=right | 5.1 km || 
|-id=849 bgcolor=#E9E9E9
| 153849 ||  || — || December 9, 2001 || Socorro || LINEAR || — || align=right | 4.9 km || 
|-id=850 bgcolor=#E9E9E9
| 153850 ||  || — || December 9, 2001 || Socorro || LINEAR || — || align=right | 4.8 km || 
|-id=851 bgcolor=#E9E9E9
| 153851 ||  || — || December 9, 2001 || Socorro || LINEAR || — || align=right | 3.8 km || 
|-id=852 bgcolor=#E9E9E9
| 153852 ||  || — || December 10, 2001 || Socorro || LINEAR || — || align=right | 1.6 km || 
|-id=853 bgcolor=#E9E9E9
| 153853 ||  || — || December 10, 2001 || Socorro || LINEAR || — || align=right | 3.5 km || 
|-id=854 bgcolor=#E9E9E9
| 153854 ||  || — || December 10, 2001 || Socorro || LINEAR || — || align=right | 1.8 km || 
|-id=855 bgcolor=#E9E9E9
| 153855 ||  || — || December 10, 2001 || Socorro || LINEAR || EUN || align=right | 2.3 km || 
|-id=856 bgcolor=#fefefe
| 153856 ||  || — || December 10, 2001 || Socorro || LINEAR || MAS || align=right | 1.7 km || 
|-id=857 bgcolor=#E9E9E9
| 153857 ||  || — || December 10, 2001 || Socorro || LINEAR || EUN || align=right | 2.2 km || 
|-id=858 bgcolor=#E9E9E9
| 153858 ||  || — || December 10, 2001 || Socorro || LINEAR || — || align=right | 2.9 km || 
|-id=859 bgcolor=#E9E9E9
| 153859 ||  || — || December 10, 2001 || Socorro || LINEAR || — || align=right | 4.0 km || 
|-id=860 bgcolor=#E9E9E9
| 153860 ||  || — || December 10, 2001 || Socorro || LINEAR || — || align=right | 2.1 km || 
|-id=861 bgcolor=#E9E9E9
| 153861 ||  || — || December 11, 2001 || Socorro || LINEAR || — || align=right | 2.0 km || 
|-id=862 bgcolor=#E9E9E9
| 153862 ||  || — || December 11, 2001 || Socorro || LINEAR || — || align=right | 2.1 km || 
|-id=863 bgcolor=#E9E9E9
| 153863 ||  || — || December 11, 2001 || Socorro || LINEAR || — || align=right | 2.0 km || 
|-id=864 bgcolor=#E9E9E9
| 153864 ||  || — || December 11, 2001 || Socorro || LINEAR || — || align=right | 2.3 km || 
|-id=865 bgcolor=#E9E9E9
| 153865 ||  || — || December 11, 2001 || Socorro || LINEAR || — || align=right | 1.8 km || 
|-id=866 bgcolor=#E9E9E9
| 153866 ||  || — || December 11, 2001 || Socorro || LINEAR || RAF || align=right | 1.7 km || 
|-id=867 bgcolor=#E9E9E9
| 153867 ||  || — || December 11, 2001 || Socorro || LINEAR || — || align=right | 2.0 km || 
|-id=868 bgcolor=#E9E9E9
| 153868 ||  || — || December 11, 2001 || Socorro || LINEAR || — || align=right | 4.0 km || 
|-id=869 bgcolor=#E9E9E9
| 153869 ||  || — || December 11, 2001 || Socorro || LINEAR || — || align=right | 2.0 km || 
|-id=870 bgcolor=#E9E9E9
| 153870 ||  || — || December 13, 2001 || Socorro || LINEAR || — || align=right | 2.5 km || 
|-id=871 bgcolor=#E9E9E9
| 153871 ||  || — || December 10, 2001 || Uccle || T. Pauwels || — || align=right | 1.8 km || 
|-id=872 bgcolor=#E9E9E9
| 153872 ||  || — || December 10, 2001 || Socorro || LINEAR || MAR || align=right | 1.8 km || 
|-id=873 bgcolor=#E9E9E9
| 153873 ||  || — || December 10, 2001 || Socorro || LINEAR || — || align=right | 2.4 km || 
|-id=874 bgcolor=#fefefe
| 153874 ||  || — || December 11, 2001 || Socorro || LINEAR || H || align=right data-sort-value="0.85" | 850 m || 
|-id=875 bgcolor=#fefefe
| 153875 ||  || — || December 14, 2001 || Socorro || LINEAR || H || align=right | 1.3 km || 
|-id=876 bgcolor=#E9E9E9
| 153876 ||  || — || December 14, 2001 || Socorro || LINEAR || — || align=right | 1.3 km || 
|-id=877 bgcolor=#E9E9E9
| 153877 ||  || — || December 14, 2001 || Socorro || LINEAR || — || align=right | 4.1 km || 
|-id=878 bgcolor=#E9E9E9
| 153878 ||  || — || December 14, 2001 || Socorro || LINEAR || — || align=right | 1.5 km || 
|-id=879 bgcolor=#E9E9E9
| 153879 ||  || — || December 14, 2001 || Socorro || LINEAR || — || align=right | 2.2 km || 
|-id=880 bgcolor=#E9E9E9
| 153880 ||  || — || December 14, 2001 || Socorro || LINEAR || — || align=right | 2.1 km || 
|-id=881 bgcolor=#fefefe
| 153881 ||  || — || December 14, 2001 || Socorro || LINEAR || NYS || align=right | 1.7 km || 
|-id=882 bgcolor=#E9E9E9
| 153882 ||  || — || December 14, 2001 || Socorro || LINEAR || — || align=right | 3.4 km || 
|-id=883 bgcolor=#E9E9E9
| 153883 ||  || — || December 14, 2001 || Socorro || LINEAR || — || align=right | 2.2 km || 
|-id=884 bgcolor=#E9E9E9
| 153884 ||  || — || December 14, 2001 || Socorro || LINEAR || — || align=right | 2.4 km || 
|-id=885 bgcolor=#E9E9E9
| 153885 ||  || — || December 14, 2001 || Socorro || LINEAR || — || align=right | 1.9 km || 
|-id=886 bgcolor=#E9E9E9
| 153886 ||  || — || December 14, 2001 || Socorro || LINEAR || — || align=right | 2.8 km || 
|-id=887 bgcolor=#E9E9E9
| 153887 ||  || — || December 14, 2001 || Socorro || LINEAR || — || align=right | 1.9 km || 
|-id=888 bgcolor=#E9E9E9
| 153888 ||  || — || December 14, 2001 || Socorro || LINEAR || — || align=right | 3.1 km || 
|-id=889 bgcolor=#E9E9E9
| 153889 ||  || — || December 14, 2001 || Socorro || LINEAR || — || align=right | 3.9 km || 
|-id=890 bgcolor=#E9E9E9
| 153890 ||  || — || December 14, 2001 || Socorro || LINEAR || EUN || align=right | 2.7 km || 
|-id=891 bgcolor=#E9E9E9
| 153891 ||  || — || December 14, 2001 || Socorro || LINEAR || NEM || align=right | 3.9 km || 
|-id=892 bgcolor=#E9E9E9
| 153892 ||  || — || December 14, 2001 || Socorro || LINEAR || — || align=right | 3.2 km || 
|-id=893 bgcolor=#E9E9E9
| 153893 ||  || — || December 14, 2001 || Socorro || LINEAR || — || align=right | 4.4 km || 
|-id=894 bgcolor=#E9E9E9
| 153894 ||  || — || December 14, 2001 || Socorro || LINEAR || MIS || align=right | 3.7 km || 
|-id=895 bgcolor=#fefefe
| 153895 ||  || — || December 11, 2001 || Socorro || LINEAR || — || align=right | 1.6 km || 
|-id=896 bgcolor=#E9E9E9
| 153896 ||  || — || December 11, 2001 || Socorro || LINEAR || — || align=right | 1.9 km || 
|-id=897 bgcolor=#E9E9E9
| 153897 ||  || — || December 11, 2001 || Socorro || LINEAR || — || align=right | 1.5 km || 
|-id=898 bgcolor=#E9E9E9
| 153898 ||  || — || December 11, 2001 || Socorro || LINEAR || — || align=right | 3.8 km || 
|-id=899 bgcolor=#E9E9E9
| 153899 ||  || — || December 13, 2001 || Socorro || LINEAR || — || align=right | 2.7 km || 
|-id=900 bgcolor=#E9E9E9
| 153900 ||  || — || December 14, 2001 || Socorro || LINEAR || RAF || align=right | 1.5 km || 
|}

153901–154000 

|-bgcolor=#E9E9E9
| 153901 ||  || — || December 15, 2001 || Socorro || LINEAR || — || align=right | 1.5 km || 
|-id=902 bgcolor=#fefefe
| 153902 ||  || — || December 15, 2001 || Socorro || LINEAR || — || align=right | 1.4 km || 
|-id=903 bgcolor=#E9E9E9
| 153903 ||  || — || December 15, 2001 || Socorro || LINEAR || — || align=right | 2.2 km || 
|-id=904 bgcolor=#E9E9E9
| 153904 ||  || — || December 15, 2001 || Socorro || LINEAR || — || align=right | 1.6 km || 
|-id=905 bgcolor=#E9E9E9
| 153905 ||  || — || December 15, 2001 || Socorro || LINEAR || — || align=right | 1.4 km || 
|-id=906 bgcolor=#E9E9E9
| 153906 ||  || — || December 15, 2001 || Socorro || LINEAR || — || align=right | 2.4 km || 
|-id=907 bgcolor=#fefefe
| 153907 ||  || — || December 15, 2001 || Socorro || LINEAR || NYS || align=right | 1.3 km || 
|-id=908 bgcolor=#E9E9E9
| 153908 ||  || — || December 15, 2001 || Socorro || LINEAR || — || align=right | 2.4 km || 
|-id=909 bgcolor=#E9E9E9
| 153909 ||  || — || December 15, 2001 || Socorro || LINEAR || — || align=right | 2.0 km || 
|-id=910 bgcolor=#E9E9E9
| 153910 ||  || — || December 15, 2001 || Socorro || LINEAR || — || align=right | 3.1 km || 
|-id=911 bgcolor=#E9E9E9
| 153911 ||  || — || December 14, 2001 || Socorro || LINEAR || — || align=right | 1.6 km || 
|-id=912 bgcolor=#E9E9E9
| 153912 ||  || — || December 14, 2001 || Socorro || LINEAR || HEN || align=right | 1.9 km || 
|-id=913 bgcolor=#E9E9E9
| 153913 ||  || — || December 15, 2001 || Socorro || LINEAR || — || align=right | 1.5 km || 
|-id=914 bgcolor=#E9E9E9
| 153914 ||  || — || December 14, 2001 || Cima Ekar || ADAS || — || align=right | 1.6 km || 
|-id=915 bgcolor=#E9E9E9
| 153915 ||  || — || December 14, 2001 || Socorro || LINEAR || — || align=right | 2.4 km || 
|-id=916 bgcolor=#E9E9E9
| 153916 ||  || — || December 7, 2001 || Socorro || LINEAR || EUN || align=right | 2.0 km || 
|-id=917 bgcolor=#E9E9E9
| 153917 ||  || — || December 17, 2001 || Socorro || LINEAR || — || align=right | 4.3 km || 
|-id=918 bgcolor=#E9E9E9
| 153918 ||  || — || December 17, 2001 || Socorro || LINEAR || — || align=right | 2.1 km || 
|-id=919 bgcolor=#E9E9E9
| 153919 ||  || — || December 17, 2001 || Socorro || LINEAR || NEM || align=right | 3.8 km || 
|-id=920 bgcolor=#E9E9E9
| 153920 ||  || — || December 18, 2001 || Socorro || LINEAR || — || align=right | 1.7 km || 
|-id=921 bgcolor=#E9E9E9
| 153921 ||  || — || December 18, 2001 || Socorro || LINEAR || — || align=right | 1.7 km || 
|-id=922 bgcolor=#E9E9E9
| 153922 ||  || — || December 18, 2001 || Socorro || LINEAR || — || align=right | 1.7 km || 
|-id=923 bgcolor=#E9E9E9
| 153923 ||  || — || December 18, 2001 || Socorro || LINEAR || — || align=right | 2.9 km || 
|-id=924 bgcolor=#E9E9E9
| 153924 ||  || — || December 18, 2001 || Socorro || LINEAR || — || align=right | 1.9 km || 
|-id=925 bgcolor=#E9E9E9
| 153925 ||  || — || December 18, 2001 || Socorro || LINEAR || MIS || align=right | 3.2 km || 
|-id=926 bgcolor=#E9E9E9
| 153926 ||  || — || December 18, 2001 || Socorro || LINEAR || — || align=right | 2.6 km || 
|-id=927 bgcolor=#fefefe
| 153927 ||  || — || December 18, 2001 || Socorro || LINEAR || NYS || align=right | 1.2 km || 
|-id=928 bgcolor=#E9E9E9
| 153928 ||  || — || December 18, 2001 || Socorro || LINEAR || — || align=right | 2.8 km || 
|-id=929 bgcolor=#E9E9E9
| 153929 ||  || — || December 18, 2001 || Socorro || LINEAR || — || align=right | 2.6 km || 
|-id=930 bgcolor=#d6d6d6
| 153930 ||  || — || December 18, 2001 || Socorro || LINEAR || — || align=right | 6.3 km || 
|-id=931 bgcolor=#E9E9E9
| 153931 ||  || — || December 18, 2001 || Socorro || LINEAR || — || align=right | 2.6 km || 
|-id=932 bgcolor=#E9E9E9
| 153932 ||  || — || December 18, 2001 || Socorro || LINEAR || ADE || align=right | 5.7 km || 
|-id=933 bgcolor=#E9E9E9
| 153933 ||  || — || December 18, 2001 || Socorro || LINEAR || — || align=right | 2.0 km || 
|-id=934 bgcolor=#E9E9E9
| 153934 ||  || — || December 18, 2001 || Socorro || LINEAR || — || align=right | 2.5 km || 
|-id=935 bgcolor=#E9E9E9
| 153935 ||  || — || December 18, 2001 || Socorro || LINEAR || — || align=right | 3.7 km || 
|-id=936 bgcolor=#E9E9E9
| 153936 ||  || — || December 18, 2001 || Socorro || LINEAR || — || align=right | 2.6 km || 
|-id=937 bgcolor=#E9E9E9
| 153937 ||  || — || December 17, 2001 || Socorro || LINEAR || EUN || align=right | 2.7 km || 
|-id=938 bgcolor=#E9E9E9
| 153938 ||  || — || December 17, 2001 || Socorro || LINEAR || — || align=right | 2.3 km || 
|-id=939 bgcolor=#E9E9E9
| 153939 ||  || — || December 18, 2001 || Palomar || NEAT || — || align=right | 1.7 km || 
|-id=940 bgcolor=#E9E9E9
| 153940 ||  || — || December 18, 2001 || Socorro || LINEAR || — || align=right | 4.5 km || 
|-id=941 bgcolor=#E9E9E9
| 153941 ||  || — || December 17, 2001 || Socorro || LINEAR || — || align=right | 2.0 km || 
|-id=942 bgcolor=#fefefe
| 153942 ||  || — || December 17, 2001 || Socorro || LINEAR || — || align=right | 2.1 km || 
|-id=943 bgcolor=#E9E9E9
| 153943 ||  || — || December 17, 2001 || Socorro || LINEAR || — || align=right | 2.3 km || 
|-id=944 bgcolor=#E9E9E9
| 153944 ||  || — || December 17, 2001 || Socorro || LINEAR || — || align=right | 2.2 km || 
|-id=945 bgcolor=#E9E9E9
| 153945 ||  || — || December 17, 2001 || Socorro || LINEAR || — || align=right | 1.6 km || 
|-id=946 bgcolor=#E9E9E9
| 153946 ||  || — || December 17, 2001 || Socorro || LINEAR || WIT || align=right | 1.7 km || 
|-id=947 bgcolor=#E9E9E9
| 153947 ||  || — || December 18, 2001 || Socorro || LINEAR || — || align=right | 2.3 km || 
|-id=948 bgcolor=#E9E9E9
| 153948 ||  || — || December 19, 2001 || Socorro || LINEAR || — || align=right | 2.2 km || 
|-id=949 bgcolor=#E9E9E9
| 153949 ||  || — || December 18, 2001 || Socorro || LINEAR || EUN || align=right | 2.5 km || 
|-id=950 bgcolor=#E9E9E9
| 153950 ||  || — || December 20, 2001 || Palomar || NEAT || — || align=right | 3.4 km || 
|-id=951 bgcolor=#FFC2E0
| 153951 ||  || — || January 7, 2002 || Socorro || LINEAR || AMO || align=right data-sort-value="0.68" | 680 m || 
|-id=952 bgcolor=#E9E9E9
| 153952 ||  || — || January 4, 2002 || Palomar || NEAT || — || align=right | 2.1 km || 
|-id=953 bgcolor=#FFC2E0
| 153953 ||  || — || January 9, 2002 || Socorro || LINEAR || APO +1km || align=right | 1.6 km || 
|-id=954 bgcolor=#fefefe
| 153954 ||  || — || January 11, 2002 || Desert Eagle || W. K. Y. Yeung || H || align=right | 1.1 km || 
|-id=955 bgcolor=#E9E9E9
| 153955 ||  || — || January 5, 2002 || Haleakala || NEAT || — || align=right | 2.7 km || 
|-id=956 bgcolor=#E9E9E9
| 153956 ||  || — || January 12, 2002 || Cima Ekar || ADAS || ADE || align=right | 2.9 km || 
|-id=957 bgcolor=#FFC2E0
| 153957 ||  || — || January 13, 2002 || Socorro || LINEAR || APO +1km || align=right data-sort-value="0.98" | 980 m || 
|-id=958 bgcolor=#FFC2E0
| 153958 ||  || — || January 14, 2002 || Socorro || LINEAR || APO +1kmPHAmoon || align=right data-sort-value="0.79" | 790 m || 
|-id=959 bgcolor=#E9E9E9
| 153959 ||  || — || January 12, 2002 || Kitt Peak || Spacewatch || AEO || align=right | 1.3 km || 
|-id=960 bgcolor=#E9E9E9
| 153960 ||  || — || January 8, 2002 || Socorro || LINEAR || — || align=right | 2.7 km || 
|-id=961 bgcolor=#d6d6d6
| 153961 ||  || — || January 9, 2002 || Socorro || LINEAR || TRP || align=right | 5.0 km || 
|-id=962 bgcolor=#E9E9E9
| 153962 ||  || — || January 9, 2002 || Socorro || LINEAR || MIS || align=right | 4.9 km || 
|-id=963 bgcolor=#E9E9E9
| 153963 ||  || — || January 9, 2002 || Socorro || LINEAR || — || align=right | 2.4 km || 
|-id=964 bgcolor=#E9E9E9
| 153964 ||  || — || January 9, 2002 || Socorro || LINEAR || — || align=right | 1.9 km || 
|-id=965 bgcolor=#E9E9E9
| 153965 ||  || — || January 9, 2002 || Socorro || LINEAR || NEM || align=right | 3.8 km || 
|-id=966 bgcolor=#E9E9E9
| 153966 ||  || — || January 9, 2002 || Socorro || LINEAR || — || align=right | 3.6 km || 
|-id=967 bgcolor=#d6d6d6
| 153967 ||  || — || January 9, 2002 || Socorro || LINEAR || — || align=right | 6.4 km || 
|-id=968 bgcolor=#E9E9E9
| 153968 ||  || — || January 9, 2002 || Socorro || LINEAR || — || align=right | 3.3 km || 
|-id=969 bgcolor=#E9E9E9
| 153969 ||  || — || January 9, 2002 || Socorro || LINEAR || — || align=right | 4.4 km || 
|-id=970 bgcolor=#E9E9E9
| 153970 ||  || — || January 8, 2002 || Socorro || LINEAR || — || align=right | 4.0 km || 
|-id=971 bgcolor=#E9E9E9
| 153971 ||  || — || January 9, 2002 || Socorro || LINEAR || — || align=right | 2.8 km || 
|-id=972 bgcolor=#E9E9E9
| 153972 ||  || — || January 9, 2002 || Socorro || LINEAR || — || align=right | 3.1 km || 
|-id=973 bgcolor=#E9E9E9
| 153973 ||  || — || January 9, 2002 || Socorro || LINEAR || — || align=right | 2.8 km || 
|-id=974 bgcolor=#E9E9E9
| 153974 ||  || — || January 9, 2002 || Socorro || LINEAR || — || align=right | 4.0 km || 
|-id=975 bgcolor=#E9E9E9
| 153975 ||  || — || January 8, 2002 || Socorro || LINEAR || — || align=right | 2.2 km || 
|-id=976 bgcolor=#E9E9E9
| 153976 ||  || — || January 8, 2002 || Socorro || LINEAR || HNA || align=right | 3.0 km || 
|-id=977 bgcolor=#E9E9E9
| 153977 ||  || — || January 9, 2002 || Socorro || LINEAR || — || align=right | 2.1 km || 
|-id=978 bgcolor=#E9E9E9
| 153978 ||  || — || January 9, 2002 || Socorro || LINEAR || NEM || align=right | 4.1 km || 
|-id=979 bgcolor=#E9E9E9
| 153979 ||  || — || January 9, 2002 || Socorro || LINEAR || HEN || align=right | 1.8 km || 
|-id=980 bgcolor=#d6d6d6
| 153980 ||  || — || January 9, 2002 || Socorro || LINEAR || — || align=right | 6.6 km || 
|-id=981 bgcolor=#E9E9E9
| 153981 ||  || — || January 9, 2002 || Socorro || LINEAR || — || align=right | 3.8 km || 
|-id=982 bgcolor=#E9E9E9
| 153982 ||  || — || January 9, 2002 || Socorro || LINEAR || — || align=right | 4.6 km || 
|-id=983 bgcolor=#E9E9E9
| 153983 ||  || — || January 9, 2002 || Socorro || LINEAR || — || align=right | 3.7 km || 
|-id=984 bgcolor=#E9E9E9
| 153984 ||  || — || January 12, 2002 || Palomar || NEAT || — || align=right | 3.9 km || 
|-id=985 bgcolor=#E9E9E9
| 153985 ||  || — || January 8, 2002 || Socorro || LINEAR || — || align=right | 2.7 km || 
|-id=986 bgcolor=#E9E9E9
| 153986 ||  || — || January 13, 2002 || Socorro || LINEAR || — || align=right | 2.0 km || 
|-id=987 bgcolor=#E9E9E9
| 153987 ||  || — || January 14, 2002 || Socorro || LINEAR || AEO || align=right | 1.8 km || 
|-id=988 bgcolor=#E9E9E9
| 153988 ||  || — || January 14, 2002 || Socorro || LINEAR || — || align=right | 4.6 km || 
|-id=989 bgcolor=#E9E9E9
| 153989 ||  || — || January 13, 2002 || Socorro || LINEAR || — || align=right | 4.8 km || 
|-id=990 bgcolor=#E9E9E9
| 153990 ||  || — || January 13, 2002 || Socorro || LINEAR || WIT || align=right | 1.7 km || 
|-id=991 bgcolor=#E9E9E9
| 153991 ||  || — || January 13, 2002 || Socorro || LINEAR || — || align=right | 4.4 km || 
|-id=992 bgcolor=#E9E9E9
| 153992 ||  || — || January 13, 2002 || Socorro || LINEAR || — || align=right | 4.2 km || 
|-id=993 bgcolor=#E9E9E9
| 153993 ||  || — || January 13, 2002 || Socorro || LINEAR || — || align=right | 3.7 km || 
|-id=994 bgcolor=#d6d6d6
| 153994 ||  || — || January 14, 2002 || Socorro || LINEAR || THM || align=right | 3.0 km || 
|-id=995 bgcolor=#E9E9E9
| 153995 ||  || — || January 14, 2002 || Socorro || LINEAR || — || align=right | 2.9 km || 
|-id=996 bgcolor=#E9E9E9
| 153996 ||  || — || January 14, 2002 || Socorro || LINEAR || — || align=right | 4.2 km || 
|-id=997 bgcolor=#d6d6d6
| 153997 ||  || — || January 14, 2002 || Socorro || LINEAR || — || align=right | 4.4 km || 
|-id=998 bgcolor=#E9E9E9
| 153998 ||  || — || January 5, 2002 || Palomar || NEAT || EUN || align=right | 3.0 km || 
|-id=999 bgcolor=#E9E9E9
| 153999 ||  || — || January 5, 2002 || Anderson Mesa || LONEOS || EUN || align=right | 2.9 km || 
|-id=000 bgcolor=#E9E9E9
| 154000 ||  || — || January 8, 2002 || Socorro || LINEAR || — || align=right | 4.2 km || 
|}

References

External links 
 Discovery Circumstances: Numbered Minor Planets (150001)–(155000) (IAU Minor Planet Center)

0153